This is a partial list of unnumbered minor planets for principal provisional designations assigned between 16 April and 15 June 2003. , a total of 463 bodies remain unnumbered for this period. Objects for this year are listed on the following pages: A–E · F–G · H–L · M–R · Si · Sii · Siii · Siv · T · Ui · Uii · Uiii · Uiv · V · Wi · Wii and X–Y. Also see previous and next year.

H 

|- id="2003 HL" bgcolor=#FA8072
| 0 || 2003 HL || MCA || 16.3 || 2.3 km || multiple || 2003–2020 || 31 May 2020 || 362 || align=left | Disc.: LINEAR || 
|- id="2003 HM" bgcolor=#FFC2E0
| 2 || 2003 HM || ATE || 21.8 || data-sort-value="0.16" | 160 m || multiple || 2003–2020 || 30 Jan 2020 || 69 || align=left | Disc.: LINEARPotentially hazardous object || 
|- id="2003 HN" bgcolor=#FFC2E0
| 0 || 2003 HN || APO || 19.9 || data-sort-value="0.37" | 370 m || multiple || 2003–2006 || 28 Oct 2006 || 340 || align=left | Disc.: AMOS || 
|- id="2003 HZ" bgcolor=#FA8072
| 0 || 2003 HZ || MCA || 17.61 || 1.7 km || multiple || 2003–2019 || 10 Jul 2019 || 145 || align=left | Disc.: LINEARAlt.: 2019 NE4 || 
|- id="2003 HC2" bgcolor=#fefefe
| 1 ||  || HUN || 18.7 || data-sort-value="0.54" | 540 m || multiple || 2003–2020 || 22 Nov 2020 || 35 || align=left | Disc.: SpacewatchAdded on 17 January 2021 || 
|- id="2003 HE2" bgcolor=#fefefe
| – ||  || MBA-I || 20.6 || data-sort-value="0.23" | 230 m || single || 6 days || 30 Apr 2003 || 11 || align=left | Disc.: Spacewatch || 
|- id="2003 HB3" bgcolor=#E9E9E9
| 1 ||  || MBA-M || 18.2 || data-sort-value="0.68" | 680 m || multiple || 2003–2020 || 10 Nov 2020 || 50 || align=left | Disc.: SpacewatchAlt.: 2011 FM143, 2015 FH229 || 
|- id="2003 HT4" bgcolor=#E9E9E9
| 2 ||  || MBA-M || 18.1 || 1.3 km || multiple || 2003–2016 || 13 Mar 2016 || 45 || align=left | Disc.: SpacewatchAlt.: 2016 BP75 || 
|- id="2003 HD5" bgcolor=#fefefe
| 2 ||  || MBA-I || 19.1 || data-sort-value="0.45" | 450 m || multiple || 2003–2020 || 23 Jan 2020 || 42 || align=left | Disc.: SpacewatchAlt.: 2017 HE65 || 
|- id="2003 HA7" bgcolor=#fefefe
| 0 ||  || MBA-I || 18.93 || data-sort-value="0.49" | 490 m || multiple || 2003–2021 || 28 Oct 2021 || 83 || align=left | Disc.: SpacewatchAdded on 22 July 2020Alt.: 2013 EX116 || 
|- id="2003 HC7" bgcolor=#fefefe
| 0 ||  || MBA-I || 17.9 || data-sort-value="0.78" | 780 m || multiple || 2003–2021 || 17 Jan 2021 || 69 || align=left | Disc.: Spacewatch || 
|- id="2003 HH7" bgcolor=#fefefe
| 0 ||  || MBA-I || 18.51 || data-sort-value="0.59" | 590 m || multiple || 2003–2021 || 16 May 2021 || 135 || align=left | Disc.: Spacewatch || 
|- id="2003 HW10" bgcolor=#FFC2E0
| 5 ||  || APO || 27.0 || data-sort-value="0.014" | 14 m || single || 3 days || 28 Apr 2003 || 94 || align=left | Disc.: LPL/Spacewatch II || 
|- id="2003 HA11" bgcolor=#d6d6d6
| 0 ||  || MBA-O || 16.16 || 3.3 km || multiple || 2003–2021 || 05 Sep 2021 || 195 || align=left | Disc.: SpacewatchAlt.: 2011 SE223 || 
|- id="2003 HB11" bgcolor=#E9E9E9
| 1 ||  || MBA-M || 18.21 || data-sort-value="0.68" | 680 m || multiple || 2003–2021 || 09 Oct 2021 || 47 || align=left | Disc.: Spacewatch || 
|- id="2003 HN16" bgcolor=#FFC2E0
| 0 ||  || APO || 22.15 || data-sort-value="0.12" | 110 m || multiple || 2003–2022 || 19 May 2022 || 85 || align=left | Disc.: LINEARAMO at MPC || 
|- id="2003 HV16" bgcolor=#E9E9E9
| 0 ||  || MBA-M || 17.43 || 1.4 km || multiple || 2003–2021 || 30 Oct 2021 || 136 || align=left | Disc.: LONEOSAdded on 22 July 2020Alt.: 2020 JW4 || 
|- id="2003 HZ16" bgcolor=#fefefe
| 0 ||  || MBA-I || 17.08 || 1.1 km || multiple || 2003–2021 || 07 May 2021 || 186 || align=left | Disc.: LONEOSAlt.: 2010 KK88, 2015 VT20 || 
|- id="2003 HU17" bgcolor=#E9E9E9
| 0 ||  || MBA-M || 17.66 || 1.2 km || multiple || 2000–2021 || 27 Nov 2021 || 111 || align=left | Disc.: Spacewatch || 
|- id="2003 HX17" bgcolor=#fefefe
| 2 ||  || MBA-I || 18.4 || data-sort-value="0.62" | 620 m || multiple || 2003–2020 || 17 Jun 2020 || 38 || align=left | Disc.: SpacewatchAdded on 22 July 2020 || 
|- id="2003 HA18" bgcolor=#d6d6d6
| 0 ||  || MBA-O || 16.8 || 2.4 km || multiple || 2003–2020 || 26 Apr 2020 || 62 || align=left | Disc.: SpacewatchAdded on 22 July 2020Alt.: 2014 EK159 || 
|- id="2003 HE18" bgcolor=#d6d6d6
| 0 ||  || MBA-O || 15.9 || 3.7 km || multiple || 2000–2020 || 25 May 2020 || 153 || align=left | Disc.: SpacewatchAlt.: 2011 UC325 || 
|- id="2003 HG18" bgcolor=#E9E9E9
| 0 ||  || MBA-M || 18.30 || data-sort-value="0.65" | 650 m || multiple || 2000–2021 || 07 Nov 2021 || 53 || align=left | Disc.: Spacewatch || 
|- id="2003 HN18" bgcolor=#fefefe
| 0 ||  || MBA-I || 18.0 || data-sort-value="0.75" | 750 m || multiple || 1999–2019 || 19 Nov 2019 || 86 || align=left | Disc.: SpacewatchAlt.: 2011 OM41, 2015 RM244 || 
|- id="2003 HO18" bgcolor=#fefefe
| 0 ||  || MBA-I || 17.70 || data-sort-value="0.86" | 860 m || multiple || 2000–2021 || 03 May 2021 || 93 || align=left | Disc.: Spacewatch || 
|- id="2003 HS18" bgcolor=#d6d6d6
| 0 ||  || MBA-O || 16.2 || 3.2 km || multiple || 2003–2020 || 16 May 2020 || 107 || align=left | Disc.: Spacewatch || 
|- id="2003 HW18" bgcolor=#fefefe
| 0 ||  || MBA-I || 18.23 || data-sort-value="0.67" | 670 m || multiple || 2003–2021 || 12 Apr 2021 || 48 || align=left | Disc.: SpacewatchAlt.: 2004 VL68 || 
|- id="2003 HA19" bgcolor=#fefefe
| 0 ||  || MBA-I || 18.74 || data-sort-value="0.53" | 530 m || multiple || 2003–2021 || 30 Jul 2021 || 70 || align=left | Disc.: LPL/Spacewatch IIAlt.: 2010 OA50, 2017 JV || 
|- id="2003 HJ19" bgcolor=#E9E9E9
| 0 ||  || MBA-M || 17.6 || 1.7 km || multiple || 2003–2021 || 14 Jan 2021 || 36 || align=left | Disc.: Spacewatch || 
|- id="2003 HK19" bgcolor=#fefefe
| 4 ||  || MBA-I || 19.2 || data-sort-value="0.43" | 430 m || multiple || 2003–2020 || 27 Apr 2020 || 24 || align=left | Disc.: SpacewatchAdded on 19 October 2020 || 
|- id="2003 HO22" bgcolor=#fefefe
| 0 ||  || MBA-I || 17.2 || 1.1 km || multiple || 2003–2021 || 05 Jan 2021 || 143 || align=left | Disc.: SpacewatchAlt.: 2010 FH75 || 
|- id="2003 HH23" bgcolor=#fefefe
| 0 ||  || MBA-I || 18.2 || data-sort-value="0.68" | 680 m || multiple || 2003–2021 || 17 Jan 2021 || 88 || align=left | Disc.: SpacewatchAlt.: 2014 GS9 || 
|- id="2003 HR23" bgcolor=#E9E9E9
| 1 ||  || MBA-M || 18.2 || data-sort-value="0.96" | 960 m || multiple || 2003–2020 || 11 Aug 2020 || 47 || align=left | Disc.: SpacewatchAdded on 22 July 2020 || 
|- id="2003 HV23" bgcolor=#d6d6d6
| 0 ||  || MBA-O || 16.91 || 2.3 km || multiple || 2003–2021 || 07 Nov 2021 || 152 || align=left | Disc.: LPL/Spacewatch IIAlt.: 2009 KT6, 2010 NE113, 2016 UG168 || 
|- id="2003 HW23" bgcolor=#E9E9E9
| 0 ||  || MBA-M || 17.85 || 1.1 km || multiple || 2003–2021 || 13 Sep 2021 || 82 || align=left | Disc.: SpacewatchAlt.: 2016 GF190, 2017 SW116 || 
|- id="2003 HY23" bgcolor=#d6d6d6
| 0 ||  || MBA-O || 16.8 || 2.4 km || multiple || 2003–2020 || 23 Apr 2020 || 42 || align=left | Disc.: SpacewatchAdded on 22 July 2020 || 
|- id="2003 HJ24" bgcolor=#d6d6d6
| 6 ||  || MBA-O || 17.3 || 1.9 km || multiple || 2003–2014 || 31 Jul 2014 || 27 || align=left | Disc.: LPL/Spacewatch IIAlt.: 2014 OU269 || 
|- id="2003 HO24" bgcolor=#E9E9E9
| 0 ||  || MBA-M || 17.82 || 1.1 km || multiple || 2003–2021 || 07 Aug 2021 || 61 || align=left | Disc.: LPL/Spacewatch IIAdded on 22 July 2020 || 
|- id="2003 HP24" bgcolor=#fefefe
| 1 ||  || MBA-I || 18.4 || data-sort-value="0.62" | 620 m || multiple || 2003–2019 || 05 Nov 2019 || 35 || align=left | Disc.: LPL/Spacewatch IIAdded on 21 August 2021Alt.: 2015 RB336 || 
|- id="2003 HP25" bgcolor=#E9E9E9
| 2 ||  || MBA-M || 17.9 || data-sort-value="0.78" | 780 m || multiple || 2003–2017 || 26 Sep 2017 || 46 || align=left | Disc.: SpacewatchAlt.: 2007 EQ193 || 
|- id="2003 HV25" bgcolor=#C2FFFF
| 0 ||  || JT || 14.25 || 7.9 km || multiple || 2003–2021 || 30 Nov 2021 || 134 || align=left | Disc.: SpacewatchAdded on 9 March 2021Greek camp (L4)Alt.: 2009 WW267, 2009 WX267, 2015 HA157 || 
|- id="2003 HY25" bgcolor=#E9E9E9
| 0 ||  || MBA-M || 16.8 || 2.4 km || multiple || 2003–2021 || 18 Jan 2021 || 120 || align=left | Disc.: Spacewatch || 
|- id="2003 HK26" bgcolor=#fefefe
| 0 ||  || MBA-I || 17.46 || data-sort-value="0.96" | 960 m || multiple || 1996–2021 || 14 Jun 2021 || 204 || align=left | Disc.: Spacewatch || 
|- id="2003 HW27" bgcolor=#fefefe
| 0 ||  || MBA-I || 17.75 || data-sort-value="0.84" | 840 m || multiple || 2003–2021 || 31 Oct 2021 || 187 || align=left | Disc.: SpacewatchAlt.: 2006 BR72 || 
|- id="2003 HM29" bgcolor=#E9E9E9
| 0 ||  || MBA-M || 17.50 || 1.3 km || multiple || 2000–2021 || 05 Aug 2021 || 149 || align=left | Disc.: LONEOSAlt.: 2014 WJ124 || 
|- id="2003 HY30" bgcolor=#fefefe
| 1 ||  || MBA-I || 18.3 || data-sort-value="0.65" | 650 m || multiple || 2003–2021 || 10 Jan 2021 || 44 || align=left | Disc.: SpacewatchAlt.: 2010 HQ128 || 
|- id="2003 HO32" bgcolor=#FA8072
| 3 ||  || MCA || 22.1 || data-sort-value="0.11" | 110 m || multiple || 2003–2006 || 04 May 2006 || 41 || align=left | Disc.: SpacewatchAlt.: 2006 JY5 || 
|- id="2003 HP32" bgcolor=#FFC2E0
| 1 ||  || APO || 19.6 || data-sort-value="0.43" | 430 m || multiple || 2003–2012 || 22 May 2012 || 64 || align=left | Disc.: Spacewatch || 
|- id="2003 HD34" bgcolor=#fefefe
| 0 ||  || MBA-I || 18.60 || data-sort-value="0.57" | 570 m || multiple || 2003–2021 || 11 May 2021 || 81 || align=left | Disc.: LPL/Spacewatch II || 
|- id="2003 HN34" bgcolor=#fefefe
| 0 ||  || MBA-I || 18.3 || data-sort-value="0.65" | 650 m || multiple || 2003–2021 || 18 Jan 2021 || 59 || align=left | Disc.: Spacewatch || 
|- id="2003 HA35" bgcolor=#fefefe
| 0 ||  || MBA-I || 18.13 || data-sort-value="0.70" | 700 m || multiple || 2003–2021 || 08 Apr 2021 || 77 || align=left | Disc.: SpacewatchAdded on 19 October 2020 || 
|- id="2003 HR35" bgcolor=#E9E9E9
| 0 ||  || MBA-M || 16.8 || 2.4 km || multiple || 2003–2021 || 17 Jan 2021 || 134 || align=left | Disc.: LONEOS || 
|- id="2003 HM36" bgcolor=#E9E9E9
| 1 ||  || MBA-M || 17.4 || 1.4 km || multiple || 2003–2020 || 25 Jan 2020 || 41 || align=left | Disc.: LPL/Spacewatch II || 
|- id="2003 HR36" bgcolor=#d6d6d6
| 0 ||  || MBA-O || 16.6 || 2.7 km || multiple || 2003–2021 || 02 Oct 2021 || 102 || align=left | Disc.: SpacewatchAlt.: 2010 NV51, 2015 PC237 || 
|- id="2003 HV36" bgcolor=#d6d6d6
| 0 ||  || MBA-O || 17.70 || 1.6 km || multiple || 2003–2020 || 13 Sep 2020 || 69 || align=left | Disc.: Spacewatch || 
|- id="2003 HT42" bgcolor=#FFC2E0
| 6 ||  || ATE || 24.8 || data-sort-value="0.039" | 39 m || single || 12 days || 11 May 2003 || 110 || align=left | Disc.: LINEAR || 
|- id="2003 HV42" bgcolor=#FA8072
| 1 ||  || MCA || 17.3 || 1.5 km || multiple || 2003–2020 || 26 May 2020 || 216 || align=left | Disc.: LINEAR || 
|- id="2003 HS44" bgcolor=#fefefe
| 0 ||  || MBA-I || 18.2 || data-sort-value="0.68" | 680 m || multiple || 2003–2021 || 18 Jan 2021 || 53 || align=left | Disc.: LPL/Spacewatch II || 
|- id="2003 HZ52" bgcolor=#fefefe
| 0 ||  || MBA-I || 17.9 || data-sort-value="0.78" | 780 m || multiple || 2003–2021 || 18 Jan 2021 || 94 || align=left | Disc.: SpacewatchAlt.: 2010 EU141, 2014 HO122 || 
|- id="2003 HA53" bgcolor=#d6d6d6
| 0 ||  || MBA-O || 16.3 || 3.9 km || multiple || 2003–2020 || 20 May 2020 || 68 || align=left | Disc.: Spacewatch || 
|- id="2003 HU53" bgcolor=#E9E9E9
| 0 ||  || MBA-M || 17.4 || 1.8 km || multiple || 2003–2018 || 13 Jul 2018 || 62 || align=left | Disc.: LPL/Spacewatch IIAlt.: 2008 JL36 || 
|- id="2003 HC55" bgcolor=#E9E9E9
| 0 ||  || MBA-M || 16.78 || 2.5 km || multiple || 2003–2021 || 17 Apr 2021 || 139 || align=left | Disc.: LPL/Spacewatch II || 
|- id="2003 HL55" bgcolor=#E9E9E9
| 3 ||  || MBA-M || 17.4 || 1.8 km || multiple || 2003–2021 || 17 Jan 2021 || 25 || align=left | Disc.: CINEOS || 
|- id="2003 HV55" bgcolor=#d6d6d6
| 0 ||  || MBA-O || 16.77 || 2.5 km || multiple || 2003–2021 || 11 Oct 2021 || 61 || align=left | Disc.: Spacewatch || 
|- id="2003 HX56" bgcolor=#C2E0FF
| 3 ||  || TNO || 7.1 || 158 km || multiple || 2003–2019 || 06 Jun 2019 || 23 || align=left | Disc.: Mauna Kea Obs.LoUTNOs, other TNO, BR-mag: 1.01 || 
|- id="2003 HZ56" bgcolor=#C2E0FF
| 3 ||  || TNO || 7.5 || 105 km || multiple || 2003–2013 || 14 May 2013 || 17 || align=left | Disc.: Mauna Kea Obs.LoUTNOs, cubewano (cold) || 
|- id="2003 HA57" bgcolor=#C2E0FF
| 2 ||  || TNO || 8.1 || 113 km || multiple || 2003–2019 || 07 May 2019 || 17 || align=left | Disc.: Mauna Kea Obs.LoUTNOs, plutino || 
|- id="2003 HD57" bgcolor=#C2E0FF
| 2 ||  || TNO || 7.9 || 124 km || multiple || 2003–2014 || 01 May 2014 || 23 || align=left | Disc.: Mauna Kea Obs.LoUTNOs, plutino || 
|- id="2003 HE57" bgcolor=#C2E0FF
| 3 ||  || TNO || 7.3 || 178 km || multiple || 2003–2015 || 26 Apr 2015 || 25 || align=left | Disc.: Mauna Kea Obs.LoUTNOs, cubewano (hot) || 
|- id="2003 HF57" bgcolor=#C2E0FF
| 3 ||  || TNO || 8.6 || 90 km || multiple || 2003–2017 || 29 May 2017 || 27 || align=left | Disc.: Mauna Kea Obs.LoUTNOs, plutino || 
|- id="2003 HG57" bgcolor=#C2E0FF
| 3 ||  || TNO || 6.5 || 118 km || multiple || 2003–2015 || 22 May 2015 || 26 || align=left | Disc.: Mauna Kea Obs.LoUTNOs, cubewano (cold), binary: 118 km || 
|- id="2003 HH57" bgcolor=#C2E0FF
| 3 ||  || TNO || 7.4 || 110 km || multiple || 2003–2013 || 14 May 2013 || 19 || align=left | Disc.: Mauna Kea Obs.LoUTNOs, cubewano (cold) || 
|- id="2003 HJ57" bgcolor=#C2E0FF
| E ||  || TNO || 8.3 || 103 km || single || 1 day || 27 Apr 2003 || 4 || align=left | Disc.: Mauna Kea Obs.LoUTNOs, plutino? || 
|- id="2003 HK57" bgcolor=#C2E0FF
| E ||  || TNO || 8.0 || 86 km || single || 1 day || 27 Apr 2003 || 4 || align=left | Disc.: Mauna Kea Obs.LoUTNOs, cubewano? || 
|- id="2003 HL57" bgcolor=#C2E0FF
| E ||  || TNO || 6.3 || 189 km || single || 1 day || 27 Apr 2003 || 7 || align=left | Disc.: Mauna Kea Obs.LoUTNOs, cubewano? || 
|- id="2003 HM57" bgcolor=#C2E0FF
| 0 ||  || TNO || 8.4 || 116 km || multiple || 2003–2017 || 21 Jul 2017 || 99 || align=left | Disc.: Mauna Kea Obs.LoUTNOs, centaur || 
|- id="2003 HN57" bgcolor=#C2E0FF
| E ||  || TNO || 7.5 || 109 km || single || 34 days || 30 May 2003 || 7 || align=left | Disc.: Mauna Kea Obs.LoUTNOs, cubewano? || 
|- id="2003 HO57" bgcolor=#C2E0FF
| 3 ||  || TNO || 8.0 || 83 km || multiple || 2003–2019 || 05 Apr 2019 || 15 || align=left | Disc.: Mauna Kea Obs.LoUTNOs, cubewano (cold) || 
|- id="2003 HP57" bgcolor=#C2E0FF
| E ||  || TNO || 6.4 || 218 km || single || 1 day || 27 Apr 2003 || 4 || align=left | Disc.: Mauna Kea Obs.LoUTNOs, other TNO || 
|- id="2003 HE58" bgcolor=#fefefe
| 0 ||  || MBA-I || 18.39 || data-sort-value="0.62" | 620 m || multiple || 2001–2021 || 11 May 2021 || 94 || align=left | Disc.: LPL/Spacewatch IIAlt.: 2013 AT26 || 
|- id="2003 HL58" bgcolor=#fefefe
| 1 ||  || HUN || 18.9 || data-sort-value="0.49" | 490 m || multiple || 2003–2020 || 24 Dec 2020 || 47 || align=left | Disc.: LPL/Spacewatch II || 
|- id="2003 HT58" bgcolor=#FA8072
| 0 ||  || MCA || 18.38 || data-sort-value="0.63" | 630 m || multiple || 2003–2020 || 21 Aug 2020 || 142 || align=left | Disc.: SDSS || 
|- id="2003 HL59" bgcolor=#fefefe
| 0 ||  || MBA-I || 18.3 || data-sort-value="0.65" | 650 m || multiple || 2003–2020 || 06 Dec 2020 || 98 || align=left | Disc.: Spacewatch || 
|- id="2003 HM59" bgcolor=#d6d6d6
| 0 ||  || MBA-O || 16.2 || 3.2 km || multiple || 2003–2020 || 11 May 2020 || 113 || align=left | Disc.: Siding Spring || 
|- id="2003 HN59" bgcolor=#E9E9E9
| 0 ||  || MBA-M || 17.6 || data-sort-value="0.90" | 900 m || multiple || 2003–2020 || 13 May 2020 || 85 || align=left | Disc.: Spacewatch || 
|- id="2003 HO59" bgcolor=#E9E9E9
| 0 ||  || MBA-M || 16.3 || 2.3 km || multiple || 2003–2020 || 17 Apr 2020 || 90 || align=left | Disc.: SDSS || 
|- id="2003 HP59" bgcolor=#fefefe
| 0 ||  || MBA-I || 17.6 || data-sort-value="0.90" | 900 m || multiple || 2003–2020 || 05 Jan 2020 || 98 || align=left | Disc.: LPL/Spacewatch II || 
|- id="2003 HQ59" bgcolor=#d6d6d6
| 0 ||  || MBA-O || 16.07 || 3.4 km || multiple || 2003–2021 || 06 Dec 2021 || 165 || align=left | Disc.: SDSS || 
|- id="2003 HS59" bgcolor=#fefefe
| 0 ||  || MBA-I || 18.3 || data-sort-value="0.65" | 650 m || multiple || 2003–2019 || 10 Jul 2019 || 122 || align=left | Disc.: Spacewatch || 
|- id="2003 HU59" bgcolor=#fefefe
| 0 ||  || MBA-I || 17.7 || data-sort-value="0.86" | 860 m || multiple || 2003–2020 || 22 Jan 2020 || 94 || align=left | Disc.: Spacewatch || 
|- id="2003 HW59" bgcolor=#fefefe
| 0 ||  || MBA-I || 17.9 || data-sort-value="0.78" | 780 m || multiple || 2003–2021 || 16 Jan 2021 || 125 || align=left | Disc.: Spacewatch || 
|- id="2003 HX59" bgcolor=#fefefe
| 0 ||  || MBA-I || 18.3 || data-sort-value="0.65" | 650 m || multiple || 2003–2020 || 12 Sep 2020 || 75 || align=left | Disc.: Spacewatch || 
|- id="2003 HZ59" bgcolor=#E9E9E9
| 0 ||  || MBA-M || 16.64 || 2.6 km || multiple || 2003–2021 || 10 Feb 2021 || 136 || align=left | Disc.: SDSS || 
|- id="2003 HA60" bgcolor=#fefefe
| 1 ||  || HUN || 18.6 || data-sort-value="0.57" | 570 m || multiple || 2003–2017 || 24 Nov 2017 || 72 || align=left | Disc.: Spacewatch || 
|- id="2003 HB60" bgcolor=#d6d6d6
| 0 ||  || MBA-O || 17.27 || 2.0 km || multiple || 2004–2022 || 25 Jan 2022 || 88 || align=left | Disc.: Spacewatch || 
|- id="2003 HD60" bgcolor=#fefefe
| 0 ||  || HUN || 19.64 || data-sort-value="0.35" | 350 m || multiple || 2003–2021 || 26 Nov 2021 || 116 || align=left | Disc.: LPL/Spacewatch II || 
|- id="2003 HH60" bgcolor=#d6d6d6
| 0 ||  || MBA-O || 16.7 || 2.5 km || multiple || 2003–2021 || 04 Oct 2021 || 79 || align=left | Disc.: LPL/Spacewatch II || 
|- id="2003 HJ60" bgcolor=#E9E9E9
| 0 ||  || MBA-M || 17.2 || 2.0 km || multiple || 2003–2021 || 20 Jan 2021 || 65 || align=left | Disc.: CINEOS || 
|- id="2003 HK60" bgcolor=#d6d6d6
| 0 ||  || MBA-O || 16.17 || 3.2 km || multiple || 2003–2021 || 04 Dec 2021 || 119 || align=left | Disc.: SDSS || 
|- id="2003 HM60" bgcolor=#d6d6d6
| 0 ||  || MBA-O || 16.05 || 3.4 km || multiple || 2003–2022 || 11 Jan 2022 || 83 || align=left | Disc.: LPL/Spacewatch II || 
|- id="2003 HN60" bgcolor=#fefefe
| 0 ||  || HUN || 18.55 || data-sort-value="0.58" | 580 m || multiple || 2003–2021 || 29 Jul 2021 || 73 || align=left | Disc.: SDSS || 
|- id="2003 HO60" bgcolor=#d6d6d6
| 0 ||  || MBA-O || 16.2 || 3.2 km || multiple || 2000–2020 || 22 May 2020 || 103 || align=left | Disc.: LPL/Spacewatch II || 
|- id="2003 HP60" bgcolor=#fefefe
| 0 ||  || HUN || 18.7 || data-sort-value="0.54" | 540 m || multiple || 2003–2021 || 17 Jan 2021 || 59 || align=left | Disc.: SDSS || 
|- id="2003 HQ60" bgcolor=#d6d6d6
| 0 ||  || MBA-O || 16.91 || 2.3 km || multiple || 2003–2021 || 30 Nov 2021 || 102 || align=left | Disc.: Spacewatch || 
|- id="2003 HU60" bgcolor=#fefefe
| 0 ||  || MBA-I || 17.9 || data-sort-value="0.78" | 780 m || multiple || 2003–2021 || 18 Jan 2021 || 80 || align=left | Disc.: Spacewatch || 
|- id="2003 HW60" bgcolor=#C2FFFF
| 0 ||  || JT || 13.51 || 11 km || multiple || 2003–2022 || 25 Jan 2022 || 207 || align=left | Disc.: SDSSGreek camp (L4) || 
|- id="2003 HY60" bgcolor=#E9E9E9
| 0 ||  || MBA-M || 17.2 || 2.0 km || multiple || 2003–2019 || 19 Dec 2019 || 59 || align=left | Disc.: Spacewatch || 
|- id="2003 HZ60" bgcolor=#fefefe
| 0 ||  || MBA-I || 18.5 || data-sort-value="0.59" | 590 m || multiple || 1996–2020 || 25 Jan 2020 || 61 || align=left | Disc.: Spacewatch || 
|- id="2003 HB61" bgcolor=#d6d6d6
| 0 ||  || MBA-O || 16.4 || 2.9 km || multiple || 2000–2020 || 24 Mar 2020 || 66 || align=left | Disc.: Spacewatch || 
|- id="2003 HD61" bgcolor=#E9E9E9
| 2 ||  || MBA-M || 18.70 || data-sort-value="0.54" | 540 m || multiple || 2003–2020 || 17 Aug 2020 || 53 || align=left | Disc.: Spacewatch || 
|- id="2003 HF61" bgcolor=#FA8072
| 0 ||  || MCA || 18.1 || data-sort-value="0.71" | 710 m || multiple || 2003–2020 || 15 Dec 2020 || 55 || align=left | Disc.: Spacewatch || 
|- id="2003 HH61" bgcolor=#fefefe
| 0 ||  || MBA-I || 18.0 || data-sort-value="0.75" | 750 m || multiple || 2003–2020 || 11 Dec 2020 || 74 || align=left | Disc.: SpacewatchAlt.: 2010 FG114 || 
|- id="2003 HK61" bgcolor=#E9E9E9
| 0 ||  || MBA-M || 17.4 || 1.4 km || multiple || 1995–2017 || 29 Sep 2017 || 49 || align=left | Disc.: SDSS || 
|- id="2003 HL61" bgcolor=#E9E9E9
| 0 ||  || MBA-M || 17.2 || 2.0 km || multiple || 2003–2021 || 23 Jan 2021 || 57 || align=left | Disc.: LPL/Spacewatch II || 
|- id="2003 HO61" bgcolor=#d6d6d6
| 0 ||  || MBA-O || 17.2 || 2.0 km || multiple || 2003–2019 || 28 Feb 2019 || 48 || align=left | Disc.: Mauna Kea Obs. || 
|- id="2003 HR61" bgcolor=#d6d6d6
| 0 ||  || MBA-O || 16.5 || 2.8 km || multiple || 2003–2020 || 24 Mar 2020 || 68 || align=left | Disc.: LPL/Spacewatch II || 
|- id="2003 HS61" bgcolor=#E9E9E9
| 0 ||  || MBA-M || 17.3 || 1.9 km || multiple || 2003–2021 || 17 Jan 2021 || 46 || align=left | Disc.: Spacewatch || 
|- id="2003 HT61" bgcolor=#fefefe
| 0 ||  || MBA-I || 18.57 || data-sort-value="0.57" | 570 m || multiple || 2003–2021 || 08 May 2021 || 71 || align=left | Disc.: Spacewatch || 
|- id="2003 HU61" bgcolor=#E9E9E9
| 0 ||  || MBA-M || 17.03 || 1.7 km || multiple || 2003–2021 || 07 Aug 2021 || 64 || align=left | Disc.: SDSS || 
|- id="2003 HV61" bgcolor=#fefefe
| 0 ||  || MBA-I || 18.32 || data-sort-value="0.64" | 640 m || multiple || 2010–2021 || 15 May 2021 || 78 || align=left | Disc.: Spacewatch || 
|- id="2003 HZ61" bgcolor=#E9E9E9
| 0 ||  || MBA-M || 17.1 || 1.6 km || multiple || 2003–2020 || 21 Apr 2020 || 53 || align=left | Disc.: SDSS || 
|- id="2003 HA62" bgcolor=#fefefe
| 0 ||  || HUN || 18.36 || data-sort-value="0.63" | 630 m || multiple || 2003–2021 || 13 Apr 2021 || 94 || align=left | Disc.: SDSS || 
|- id="2003 HB62" bgcolor=#E9E9E9
| 0 ||  || MBA-M || 17.2 || 2.0 km || multiple || 2003–2021 || 16 Jan 2021 || 66 || align=left | Disc.: Spacewatch || 
|- id="2003 HC62" bgcolor=#E9E9E9
| 1 ||  || MBA-M || 17.69 || 1.6 km || multiple || 2003–2021 || 03 Apr 2021 || 51 || align=left | Disc.: Spacewatch || 
|- id="2003 HD62" bgcolor=#fefefe
| 0 ||  || MBA-I || 17.9 || data-sort-value="0.78" | 780 m || multiple || 2003–2018 || 14 Jun 2018 || 32 || align=left | Disc.: SDSS || 
|- id="2003 HE62" bgcolor=#fefefe
| 0 ||  || MBA-I || 18.5 || data-sort-value="0.59" | 590 m || multiple || 2003–2020 || 27 Jun 2020 || 42 || align=left | Disc.: Spacewatch || 
|- id="2003 HF62" bgcolor=#E9E9E9
| 0 ||  || MBA-M || 17.34 || 1.0 km || multiple || 2003–2021 || 05 Dec 2021 || 61 || align=left | Disc.: SDSS || 
|- id="2003 HG62" bgcolor=#E9E9E9
| 0 ||  || MBA-M || 17.79 || 1.2 km || multiple || 2003–2021 || 25 Nov 2021 || 100 || align=left | Disc.: Spacewatch || 
|- id="2003 HH62" bgcolor=#fefefe
| 0 ||  || MBA-I || 18.6 || data-sort-value="0.57" | 570 m || multiple || 2003–2017 || 20 Apr 2017 || 36 || align=left | Disc.: Spacewatch || 
|- id="2003 HJ62" bgcolor=#E9E9E9
| 0 ||  || MBA-M || 17.80 || 1.2 km || multiple || 2003–2021 || 03 Dec 2021 || 75 || align=left | Disc.: SDSS || 
|- id="2003 HK62" bgcolor=#E9E9E9
| 0 ||  || MBA-M || 17.98 || 1.4 km || multiple || 2003–2021 || 11 Jul 2021 || 79 || align=left | Disc.: SDSS || 
|- id="2003 HL62" bgcolor=#fefefe
| 0 ||  || MBA-I || 18.90 || data-sort-value="0.49" | 490 m || multiple || 2003–2021 || 30 Jul 2021 || 48 || align=left | Disc.: Spacewatch || 
|- id="2003 HM62" bgcolor=#fefefe
| 0 ||  || MBA-I || 17.7 || data-sort-value="0.86" | 860 m || multiple || 2003–2021 || 04 Jan 2021 || 46 || align=left | Disc.: SDSS || 
|- id="2003 HN62" bgcolor=#fefefe
| 0 ||  || MBA-I || 19.0 || data-sort-value="0.47" | 470 m || multiple || 2003–2020 || 14 Sep 2020 || 40 || align=left | Disc.: Spacewatch || 
|- id="2003 HO62" bgcolor=#fefefe
| 0 ||  || MBA-I || 18.3 || data-sort-value="0.65" | 650 m || multiple || 2003–2018 || 18 Mar 2018 || 81 || align=left | Disc.: Spacewatch || 
|- id="2003 HP62" bgcolor=#d6d6d6
| 0 ||  || MBA-O || 16.8 || 2.4 km || multiple || 2003–2020 || 14 Jun 2020 || 45 || align=left | Disc.: Spacewatch || 
|- id="2003 HQ62" bgcolor=#E9E9E9
| 0 ||  || MBA-M || 17.5 || 1.3 km || multiple || 2003–2020 || 25 May 2020 || 53 || align=left | Disc.: Spacewatch || 
|- id="2003 HR62" bgcolor=#E9E9E9
| 0 ||  || MBA-M || 17.73 || 1.2 km || multiple || 2003–2021 || 10 Aug 2021 || 61 || align=left | Disc.: Spacewatch || 
|- id="2003 HS62" bgcolor=#fefefe
| 1 ||  || HUN || 18.8 || data-sort-value="0.52" | 520 m || multiple || 2003–2019 || 08 Jan 2019 || 24 || align=left | Disc.: SDSS || 
|- id="2003 HT62" bgcolor=#fefefe
| 1 ||  || MBA-I || 18.6 || data-sort-value="0.57" | 570 m || multiple || 2003–2021 || 18 Jan 2021 || 32 || align=left | Disc.: Spacewatch || 
|- id="2003 HU62" bgcolor=#E9E9E9
| 1 ||  || MBA-M || 17.8 || 1.2 km || multiple || 2003–2020 || 16 Aug 2020 || 87 || align=left | Disc.: LPL/Spacewatch II || 
|- id="2003 HW62" bgcolor=#fefefe
| 0 ||  || MBA-I || 17.8 || data-sort-value="0.82" | 820 m || multiple || 2003–2020 || 14 Dec 2020 || 141 || align=left | Disc.: Spacewatch || 
|- id="2003 HY62" bgcolor=#E9E9E9
| 0 ||  || MBA-M || 17.1 || 2.1 km || multiple || 2003–2021 || 24 Jan 2021 || 75 || align=left | Disc.: Spacewatch || 
|- id="2003 HA63" bgcolor=#d6d6d6
| 0 ||  || MBA-O || 16.7 || 2.5 km || multiple || 2003–2019 || 05 Jun 2019 || 69 || align=left | Disc.: LPL/Spacewatch II || 
|- id="2003 HB63" bgcolor=#fefefe
| 0 ||  || MBA-I || 17.2 || 1.1 km || multiple || 2003–2021 || 17 Jan 2021 || 85 || align=left | Disc.: SDSS || 
|- id="2003 HC63" bgcolor=#d6d6d6
| 0 ||  || MBA-O || 16.1 || 3.4 km || multiple || 2003–2020 || 17 Jun 2020 || 94 || align=left | Disc.: Spacewatch || 
|- id="2003 HD63" bgcolor=#fefefe
| 0 ||  || MBA-I || 18.42 || data-sort-value="0.62" | 620 m || multiple || 2003–2022 || 27 Jan 2022 || 95 || align=left | Disc.: Spacewatch || 
|- id="2003 HG63" bgcolor=#E9E9E9
| 0 ||  || MBA-M || 18.0 || data-sort-value="0.75" | 750 m || multiple || 2003–2020 || 17 Oct 2020 || 75 || align=left | Disc.: Spacewatch || 
|- id="2003 HH63" bgcolor=#d6d6d6
| 0 ||  || MBA-O || 16.62 || 2.6 km || multiple || 1995–2021 || 30 Nov 2021 || 145 || align=left | Disc.: SpacewatchAlt.: 1995 UB79, 2010 MF101 || 
|- id="2003 HJ63" bgcolor=#d6d6d6
| 0 ||  || MBA-O || 16.5 || 2.8 km || multiple || 2002–2020 || 29 May 2020 || 130 || align=left | Disc.: SDSS || 
|- id="2003 HK63" bgcolor=#fefefe
| 0 ||  || MBA-I || 17.6 || data-sort-value="0.90" | 900 m || multiple || 2003–2021 || 08 Jan 2021 || 66 || align=left | Disc.: Spacewatch || 
|- id="2003 HL63" bgcolor=#fefefe
| 0 ||  || MBA-I || 18.35 || data-sort-value="0.64" | 640 m || multiple || 2003–2021 || 08 Apr 2021 || 67 || align=left | Disc.: LPL/Spacewatch II || 
|- id="2003 HM63" bgcolor=#d6d6d6
| 0 ||  || MBA-O || 17.46 || 1.8 km || multiple || 2003–2019 || 24 Aug 2019 || 55 || align=left | Disc.: SDSS || 
|- id="2003 HN63" bgcolor=#fefefe
| 0 ||  || MBA-I || 18.3 || data-sort-value="0.65" | 650 m || multiple || 2003–2019 || 26 Nov 2019 || 55 || align=left | Disc.: Spacewatch || 
|- id="2003 HP63" bgcolor=#d6d6d6
| 0 ||  || MBA-O || 16.6 || 2.7 km || multiple || 2003–2020 || 28 Apr 2020 || 56 || align=left | Disc.: SDSS || 
|- id="2003 HR63" bgcolor=#fefefe
| 0 ||  || MBA-I || 18.13 || data-sort-value="0.70" | 700 m || multiple || 2003–2022 || 27 Jan 2022 || 53 || align=left | Disc.: Spacewatch || 
|- id="2003 HS63" bgcolor=#d6d6d6
| 0 ||  || MBA-O || 17.0 || 2.2 km || multiple || 2003–2020 || 21 Oct 2020 || 81 || align=left | Disc.: SDSS || 
|- id="2003 HV63" bgcolor=#fefefe
| 0 ||  || MBA-I || 17.9 || data-sort-value="0.78" | 780 m || multiple || 2003–2021 || 09 Jan 2021 || 76 || align=left | Disc.: Spacewatch || 
|- id="2003 HW63" bgcolor=#fefefe
| 0 ||  || MBA-I || 18.5 || data-sort-value="0.59" | 590 m || multiple || 2003–2019 || 27 Oct 2019 || 41 || align=left | Disc.: Spacewatch || 
|- id="2003 HX63" bgcolor=#d6d6d6
| 0 ||  || MBA-O || 17.0 || 2.2 km || multiple || 2003–2020 || 14 Dec 2020 || 47 || align=left | Disc.: SDSS || 
|- id="2003 HY63" bgcolor=#d6d6d6
| 0 ||  || MBA-O || 17.8 || 1.5 km || multiple || 2003–2019 || 31 May 2019 || 40 || align=left | Disc.: Spacewatch || 
|- id="2003 HA64" bgcolor=#FA8072
| 1 ||  || MCA || 18.7 || data-sort-value="0.54" | 540 m || multiple || 2003–2019 || 01 Sep 2019 || 51 || align=left | Disc.: Spacewatch || 
|- id="2003 HB64" bgcolor=#d6d6d6
| 0 ||  || MBA-O || 16.7 || 2.5 km || multiple || 2003–2020 || 24 Jun 2020 || 70 || align=left | Disc.: SDSS || 
|- id="2003 HC64" bgcolor=#d6d6d6
| 0 ||  || HIL || 16.19 || 3.2 km || multiple || 2003–2021 || 11 Sep 2021 || 66 || align=left | Disc.: Spacewatch || 
|- id="2003 HD64" bgcolor=#fefefe
| 1 ||  || MBA-I || 17.9 || data-sort-value="0.78" | 780 m || multiple || 2003–2020 || 06 Dec 2020 || 46 || align=left | Disc.: Spacewatch || 
|- id="2003 HE64" bgcolor=#fefefe
| 0 ||  || MBA-I || 18.6 || data-sort-value="0.57" | 570 m || multiple || 2003–2020 || 08 Aug 2020 || 44 || align=left | Disc.: Spacewatch || 
|- id="2003 HF64" bgcolor=#d6d6d6
| 0 ||  || MBA-O || 17.0 || 2.2 km || multiple || 2003–2019 || 09 Feb 2019 || 34 || align=left | Disc.: SDSS || 
|- id="2003 HG64" bgcolor=#fefefe
| 0 ||  || MBA-I || 18.7 || data-sort-value="0.54" | 540 m || multiple || 2003–2018 || 12 Aug 2018 || 29 || align=left | Disc.: Spacewatch || 
|- id="2003 HH64" bgcolor=#fefefe
| 0 ||  || HUN || 19.29 || data-sort-value="0.41" | 410 m || multiple || 2003–2021 || 15 Apr 2021 || 25 || align=left | Disc.: SDSS || 
|- id="2003 HK64" bgcolor=#fefefe
| 0 ||  || MBA-I || 17.8 || data-sort-value="0.82" | 820 m || multiple || 2003–2019 || 25 Sep 2019 || 72 || align=left | Disc.: Spacewatch || 
|- id="2003 HM64" bgcolor=#E9E9E9
| 0 ||  || MBA-M || 17.1 || 2.1 km || multiple || 2003–2019 || 28 Dec 2019 || 75 || align=left | Disc.: LPL/Spacewatch II || 
|- id="2003 HN64" bgcolor=#d6d6d6
| 0 ||  || MBA-O || 15.7 || 4.0 km || multiple || 2003–2020 || 26 Jun 2020 || 96 || align=left | Disc.: SDSS || 
|- id="2003 HO64" bgcolor=#d6d6d6
| 0 ||  || MBA-O || 15.9 || 3.7 km || multiple || 2003–2020 || 12 Sep 2020 || 89 || align=left | Disc.: SDSSAlt.: 2010 PX70 || 
|- id="2003 HP64" bgcolor=#E9E9E9
| 0 ||  || MBA-M || 17.7 || 1.6 km || multiple || 2003–2021 || 16 Jan 2021 || 47 || align=left | Disc.: Spacewatch || 
|- id="2003 HU64" bgcolor=#fefefe
| 0 ||  || MBA-I || 19.25 || data-sort-value="0.42" | 420 m || multiple || 2003–2021 || 09 Jul 2021 || 43 || align=left | Disc.: Spacewatch || 
|- id="2003 HV64" bgcolor=#d6d6d6
| 0 ||  || MBA-O || 16.83 || 2.4 km || multiple || 2003–2021 || 13 Sep 2021 || 42 || align=left | Disc.: Spacewatch || 
|- id="2003 HX64" bgcolor=#fefefe
| 0 ||  || MBA-I || 18.1 || data-sort-value="0.71" | 710 m || multiple || 2003–2019 || 25 Sep 2019 || 48 || align=left | Disc.: Spacewatch || 
|- id="2003 HY64" bgcolor=#fefefe
| 0 ||  || MBA-I || 17.83 || data-sort-value="0.81" | 810 m || multiple || 2003–2021 || 17 Apr 2021 || 78 || align=left | Disc.: SDSS || 
|- id="2003 HA65" bgcolor=#fefefe
| 0 ||  || MBA-I || 17.9 || data-sort-value="0.78" | 780 m || multiple || 2003–2019 || 28 Aug 2019 || 43 || align=left | Disc.: LPL/Spacewatch II || 
|- id="2003 HB65" bgcolor=#fefefe
| 2 ||  || MBA-I || 18.6 || data-sort-value="0.57" | 570 m || multiple || 2003–2019 || 23 Oct 2019 || 40 || align=left | Disc.: Spacewatch || 
|- id="2003 HC65" bgcolor=#fefefe
| 0 ||  || MBA-I || 18.2 || data-sort-value="0.68" | 680 m || multiple || 2003–2020 || 14 Dec 2020 || 52 || align=left | Disc.: Spacewatch || 
|- id="2003 HE65" bgcolor=#E9E9E9
| 0 ||  || MBA-M || 17.6 || data-sort-value="0.90" | 900 m || multiple || 2003–2020 || 20 Jul 2020 || 43 || align=left | Disc.: Spacewatch || 
|- id="2003 HF65" bgcolor=#E9E9E9
| 3 ||  || MBA-M || 18.2 || 1.3 km || multiple || 2003–2017 || 31 May 2017 || 17 || align=left | Disc.: SDSS || 
|- id="2003 HG65" bgcolor=#E9E9E9
| 0 ||  || MBA-M || 17.3 || 1.9 km || multiple || 2003–2021 || 18 Jan 2021 || 59 || align=left | Disc.: Spacewatch || 
|- id="2003 HH65" bgcolor=#E9E9E9
| 0 ||  || MBA-M || 17.22 || 2.0 km || multiple || 1995–2021 || 03 May 2021 || 86 || align=left | Disc.: Spacewatch || 
|- id="2003 HJ65" bgcolor=#E9E9E9
| 1 ||  || MBA-M || 18.3 || data-sort-value="0.65" | 650 m || multiple || 2003–2020 || 07 Oct 2020 || 113 || align=left | Disc.: Spacewatch || 
|- id="2003 HK65" bgcolor=#fefefe
| 0 ||  || MBA-I || 18.39 || data-sort-value="0.62" | 620 m || multiple || 2003–2022 || 25 Jan 2022 || 40 || align=left | Disc.: Spacewatch || 
|- id="2003 HL65" bgcolor=#fefefe
| 0 ||  || MBA-I || 18.4 || data-sort-value="0.62" | 620 m || multiple || 2003–2021 || 22 Jan 2021 || 35 || align=left | Disc.: Spacewatch || 
|- id="2003 HM65" bgcolor=#fefefe
| 0 ||  || MBA-I || 18.71 || data-sort-value="0.54" | 540 m || multiple || 2003–2021 || 04 Oct 2021 || 70 || align=left | Disc.: Spacewatch || 
|- id="2003 HN65" bgcolor=#d6d6d6
| 2 ||  || MBA-O || 17.3 || 1.9 km || multiple || 2003–2020 || 15 Oct 2020 || 45 || align=left | Disc.: Spacewatch || 
|- id="2003 HO65" bgcolor=#fefefe
| 0 ||  || MBA-I || 17.93 || data-sort-value="0.77" | 770 m || multiple || 2003–2022 || 26 Jan 2022 || 38 || align=left | Disc.: SpacewatchAdded on 22 July 2020 || 
|- id="2003 HR65" bgcolor=#E9E9E9
| 0 ||  || MBA-M || 18.5 || data-sort-value="0.84" | 840 m || multiple || 2003–2020 || 28 Apr 2020 || 44 || align=left | Disc.: SpacewatchAdded on 22 July 2020 || 
|- id="2003 HT65" bgcolor=#fefefe
| 0 ||  || MBA-I || 18.41 || data-sort-value="0.62" | 620 m || multiple || 2003–2021 || 13 Oct 2021 || 71 || align=left | Disc.: SpacewatchAdded on 22 July 2020 || 
|- id="2003 HU65" bgcolor=#fefefe
| 1 ||  || MBA-I || 19.03 || data-sort-value="0.46" | 460 m || multiple || 2003–2021 || 06 Oct 2021 || 42 || align=left | Disc.: SpacewatchAdded on 22 July 2020 || 
|- id="2003 HW65" bgcolor=#E9E9E9
| 0 ||  || MBA-M || 17.5 || 1.8 km || multiple || 2003–2021 || 11 Jan 2021 || 55 || align=left | Disc.: SpacewatchAdded on 13 September 2020 || 
|- id="2003 HX65" bgcolor=#fefefe
| 0 ||  || MBA-I || 18.6 || data-sort-value="0.57" | 570 m || multiple || 2003–2020 || 22 Aug 2020 || 49 || align=left | Disc.: SpacewatchAdded on 19 October 2020 || 
|- id="2003 HY65" bgcolor=#d6d6d6
| 0 ||  || MBA-O || 17.3 || 1.9 km || multiple || 2003–2020 || 13 May 2020 || 41 || align=left | Disc.: MLSAdded on 19 October 2020 || 
|- id="2003 HZ65" bgcolor=#E9E9E9
| 0 ||  || MBA-M || 17.15 || 2.1 km || multiple || 2003–2021 || 18 Apr 2021 || 113 || align=left | Disc.: SpacewatchAdded on 9 March 2021 || 
|- id="2003 HA66" bgcolor=#FA8072
| 0 ||  || HUN || 19.62 || data-sort-value="0.35" | 350 m || multiple || 2003–2021 || 03 Dec 2021 || 32 || align=left | Disc.: SDSSAdded on 9 March 2021 || 
|- id="2003 HC66" bgcolor=#E9E9E9
| 2 ||  || MBA-M || 19.02 || data-sort-value="0.87" | 870 m || multiple || 2003–2021 || 12 Jun 2021 || 34 || align=left | Disc.: SpacewatchAdded on 17 June 2021 || 
|- id="2003 HD66" bgcolor=#fefefe
| 0 ||  || MBA-I || 18.8 || data-sort-value="0.52" | 520 m || multiple || 2003–2019 || 25 Jul 2019 || 43 || align=left | Disc.: SpacewatchAdded on 21 August 2021 || 
|- id="2003 HE66" bgcolor=#d6d6d6
| 2 ||  || MBA-O || 17.7 || 1.6 km || multiple || 2003–2014 || 24 Jun 2014 || 15 || align=left | Disc.: SDSSAdded on 24 December 2021 || 
|}
back to top

J 

|- id="2003 JH" bgcolor=#fefefe
| 0 || 2003 JH || MBA-I || 18.2 || data-sort-value="0.68" | 680 m || multiple || 2003–2020 || 21 Feb 2020 || 61 || align=left | Disc.: LPL/Spacewatch II || 
|- id="2003 JR" bgcolor=#fefefe
| 0 || 2003 JR || MBA-I || 18.0 || data-sort-value="0.75" | 750 m || multiple || 1999–2019 || 29 Oct 2019 || 94 || align=left | Disc.: SDSSAlt.: 1999 FX75, 2015 RK136 || 
|- id="2003 JA1" bgcolor=#E9E9E9
| 0 ||  || MBA-M || 16.45 || 1.5 km || multiple || 2001–2021 || 31 Oct 2021 || 201 || align=left | Disc.: SpacewatchAlt.: 2014 YQ36 || 
|- id="2003 JB2" bgcolor=#E9E9E9
| 0 ||  || MBA-M || 18.11 || 1.0 km || multiple || 2003–2021 || 04 Aug 2021 || 36 || align=left | Disc.: LPL/Spacewatch II || 
|- id="2003 JX2" bgcolor=#FFC2E0
| 8 ||  || APO || 26.4 || data-sort-value="0.019" | 19 m || single || 2 days || 03 May 2003 || 31 || align=left | Disc.: LINEAR || 
|- id="2003 JY2" bgcolor=#FFC2E0
| 8 ||  || APO || 24.6 || data-sort-value="0.043" | 43 m || single || 4 days || 06 May 2003 || 35 || align=left | Disc.: LINEAR || 
|- id="2003 JB4" bgcolor=#E9E9E9
| 3 ||  || MBA-M || 17.88 || data-sort-value="0.79" | 790 m || multiple || 2003–2021 || 30 Oct 2021 || 39 || align=left | Disc.: KLENOT || 
|- id="2003 JE4" bgcolor=#FA8072
| 0 ||  || MCA || 18.43 || data-sort-value="0.61" | 610 m || multiple || 2003–2021 || 11 Oct 2021 || 134 || align=left | Disc.: Spacewatch || 
|- id="2003 JG4" bgcolor=#FFC2E0
| 7 ||  || AMO || 22.9 || data-sort-value="0.093" | 93 m || single || 29 days || 01 Jun 2003 || 36 || align=left | Disc.: Spacewatch || 
|- id="2003 JA11" bgcolor=#E9E9E9
| D ||  || MBA-M || 17.6 || data-sort-value="0.90" | 900 m || single || 5 days || 05 May 2003 || 15 || align=left | Disc.: LPL/Spacewatch IIAlt.: 2003 JX17 || 
|- id="2003 JD11" bgcolor=#FFC2E0
| 6 ||  || APO || 24.3 || data-sort-value="0.049" | 49 m || single || 6 days || 11 May 2003 || 97 || align=left | Disc.: LINEAR || 
|- id="2003 JD13" bgcolor=#FFC2E0
| 0 ||  || AMO || 20.00 || data-sort-value="0.36" | 360 m || multiple || 2003–2021 || 01 Nov 2021 || 161 || align=left | Disc.: LINEAR || 
|- id="2003 JF13" bgcolor=#FA8072
| 3 ||  || MCA || 19.9 || data-sort-value="0.31" | 310 m || multiple || 2003–2007 || 26 Apr 2007 || 42 || align=left | Disc.: Spacewatch || 
|- id="2003 JN14" bgcolor=#FFC2E0
| 0 ||  || APO || 19.62 || data-sort-value="0.42" | 420 m || multiple || 2003–2021 || 17 Jan 2021 || 135 || align=left | Disc.: LINEAR || 
|- id="2003 JO14" bgcolor=#FFC2E0
| 7 ||  || APO || 25.2 || data-sort-value="0.032" | 32 m || single || 2 days || 11 May 2003 || 41 || align=left | Disc.: LINEAR || 
|- id="2003 JP14" bgcolor=#FFC2E0
| 6 ||  || APO || 22.3 || data-sort-value="0.12" | 120 m || single || 30 days || 08 Jun 2003 || 51 || align=left | Disc.: LINEAR || 
|- id="2003 JV14" bgcolor=#FFC2E0
| 6 ||  || APO || 21.5 || data-sort-value="0.18" | 180 m || single || 29 days || 08 Jun 2003 || 62 || align=left | Disc.: Spacewatch || 
|- id="2003 JP15" bgcolor=#fefefe
| 1 ||  || MBA-I || 18.8 || data-sort-value="0.52" | 520 m || multiple || 2003–2020 || 22 Oct 2020 || 48 || align=left | Disc.: LPL/Spacewatch IIAdded on 17 January 2021Alt.: 2007 UH74 || 
|- id="2003 JH16" bgcolor=#fefefe
| 0 ||  || MBA-I || 18.40 || data-sort-value="0.62" | 620 m || multiple || 2003–2021 || 14 Sep 2021 || 71 || align=left | Disc.: LPL/Spacewatch IIAlt.: 2016 AM6 || 
|- id="2003 JA17" bgcolor=#FA8072
| – ||  || MCA || 17.5 || data-sort-value="0.94" | 940 m || single || 51 days || 01 Jul 2003 || 40 || align=left | Disc.: LINEAR || 
|- id="2003 JC17" bgcolor=#FFC2E0
| 0 ||  || APO || 17.88 || data-sort-value="0.94" | 940 m || multiple || 2003–2021 || 11 Jul 2021 || 122 || align=left | Disc.: LINEARNEO larger than 1 kilometer || 
|- id="2003 JD17" bgcolor=#FFC2E0
| 4 ||  || AMO || 21.1 || data-sort-value="0.21" | 210 m || single || 109 days || 29 Aug 2003 || 40 || align=left | Disc.: LINEAR || 
|- id="2003 JN18" bgcolor=#d6d6d6
| 0 ||  || MBA-O || 16.5 || 2.8 km || multiple || 2003–2020 || 25 May 2020 || 54 || align=left | Disc.: Spacewatch || 
|- id="2003 JQ18" bgcolor=#fefefe
| 0 ||  || MBA-I || 17.5 || data-sort-value="0.94" | 940 m || multiple || 2003–2021 || 15 Jan 2021 || 106 || align=left | Disc.: Spacewatch || 
|- id="2003 JX18" bgcolor=#E9E9E9
| 0 ||  || MBA-M || 17.15 || 1.6 km || multiple || 2003–2021 || 18 Jun 2021 || 129 || align=left | Disc.: Spacewatch || 
|- id="2003 JA19" bgcolor=#fefefe
| 0 ||  || MBA-I || 17.67 || data-sort-value="0.87" | 870 m || multiple || 2003–2021 || 19 Apr 2021 || 177 || align=left | Disc.: Spacewatch || 
|- id="2003 JB19" bgcolor=#E9E9E9
| 0 ||  || MBA-M || 16.84 || 2.4 km || multiple || 2003–2021 || 13 Apr 2021 || 107 || align=left | Disc.: SpacewatchAlt.: 2017 PG25 || 
|- id="2003 JF19" bgcolor=#d6d6d6
| 0 ||  || MBA-O || 15.7 || 4.0 km || multiple || 2003–2020 || 17 Jun 2020 || 118 || align=left | Disc.: Spacewatch || 
|- id="2003 JH19" bgcolor=#E9E9E9
| 2 ||  || MBA-M || 17.9 || data-sort-value="0.78" | 780 m || multiple || 2003–2019 || 10 May 2019 || 51 || align=left | Disc.: Spacewatch || 
|- id="2003 JJ19" bgcolor=#fefefe
| 0 ||  || MBA-I || 17.3 || 1.0 km || multiple || 2003–2020 || 23 Dec 2020 || 87 || align=left | Disc.: Spacewatch || 
|- id="2003 JK19" bgcolor=#fefefe
| 0 ||  || MBA-I || 17.1 || 1.1 km || multiple || 2003–2019 || 29 Oct 2019 || 70 || align=left | Disc.: Spacewatch || 
|- id="2003 JO19" bgcolor=#E9E9E9
| 0 ||  || MBA-M || 17.47 || 1.8 km || multiple || 2007–2021 || 08 Apr 2021 || 73 || align=left | Disc.: Spacewatch || 
|- id="2003 JP19" bgcolor=#fefefe
| 0 ||  || MBA-I || 18.57 || data-sort-value="0.57" | 570 m || multiple || 2003–2021 || 11 Jun 2021 || 62 || align=left | Disc.: Spacewatch || 
|- id="2003 JQ19" bgcolor=#fefefe
| 0 ||  || MBA-I || 18.74 || data-sort-value="0.53" | 530 m || multiple || 2003–2021 || 14 May 2021 || 66 || align=left | Disc.: Spacewatch || 
|- id="2003 JR19" bgcolor=#fefefe
| 0 ||  || HUN || 18.9 || data-sort-value="0.49" | 490 m || multiple || 2003–2021 || 13 Jan 2021 || 59 || align=left | Disc.: Spacewatch || 
|- id="2003 JS19" bgcolor=#fefefe
| 0 ||  || MBA-I || 18.2 || data-sort-value="0.68" | 680 m || multiple || 2003–2019 || 08 Oct 2019 || 52 || align=left | Disc.: Spacewatch || 
|- id="2003 JT19" bgcolor=#fefefe
| 0 ||  || MBA-I || 17.2 || 1.1 km || multiple || 2003–2018 || 10 Apr 2018 || 39 || align=left | Disc.: Spacewatch || 
|- id="2003 JU19" bgcolor=#E9E9E9
| 0 ||  || MBA-M || 17.2 || 2.0 km || multiple || 2003–2021 || 15 Jan 2021 || 44 || align=left | Disc.: Spacewatch || 
|- id="2003 JX19" bgcolor=#E9E9E9
| 0 ||  || MBA-M || 17.49 || 1.8 km || multiple || 2003–2021 || 29 Apr 2021 || 121 || align=left | Disc.: Spacewatch || 
|- id="2003 JY19" bgcolor=#fefefe
| 1 ||  || MBA-I || 17.9 || data-sort-value="0.78" | 780 m || multiple || 2003–2019 || 27 Nov 2019 || 60 || align=left | Disc.: LPL/Spacewatch II || 
|- id="2003 JA20" bgcolor=#fefefe
| 0 ||  || MBA-I || 18.0 || data-sort-value="0.75" | 750 m || multiple || 2003–2021 || 18 Jan 2021 || 62 || align=left | Disc.: Spacewatch || 
|- id="2003 JB20" bgcolor=#E9E9E9
| 0 ||  || MBA-M || 17.3 || 1.9 km || multiple || 2003–2020 || 23 Dec 2020 || 56 || align=left | Disc.: Spacewatch || 
|- id="2003 JC20" bgcolor=#E9E9E9
| 2 ||  || MBA-M || 18.1 || data-sort-value="0.71" | 710 m || multiple || 2003–2020 || 13 Sep 2020 || 55 || align=left | Disc.: LPL/Spacewatch II || 
|- id="2003 JD20" bgcolor=#E9E9E9
| 0 ||  || MBA-M || 17.1 || 2.1 km || multiple || 2003–2021 || 09 Jan 2021 || 59 || align=left | Disc.: LPL/Spacewatch II || 
|- id="2003 JE20" bgcolor=#fefefe
| 0 ||  || MBA-I || 18.5 || data-sort-value="0.59" | 590 m || multiple || 2003–2019 || 07 Oct 2019 || 50 || align=left | Disc.: Spacewatch || 
|- id="2003 JF20" bgcolor=#fefefe
| 0 ||  || MBA-I || 18.7 || data-sort-value="0.54" | 540 m || multiple || 2003–2020 || 11 Sep 2020 || 92 || align=left | Disc.: LPL/Spacewatch II || 
|- id="2003 JG20" bgcolor=#d6d6d6
| 0 ||  || MBA-O || 16.5 || 2.8 km || multiple || 2003–2020 || 25 May 2020 || 84 || align=left | Disc.: LPL/Spacewatch II || 
|- id="2003 JH20" bgcolor=#fefefe
| 0 ||  || MBA-I || 18.3 || data-sort-value="0.65" | 650 m || multiple || 2003–2020 || 09 Dec 2020 || 43 || align=left | Disc.: Spacewatch || 
|- id="2003 JJ20" bgcolor=#E9E9E9
| 0 ||  || MBA-M || 17.3 || 1.9 km || multiple || 2003–2018 || 04 Oct 2018 || 31 || align=left | Disc.: Spacewatch || 
|- id="2003 JL20" bgcolor=#fefefe
| 0 ||  || MBA-I || 18.07 || data-sort-value="0.72" | 720 m || multiple || 2003–2022 || 27 Jan 2022 || 35 || align=left | Disc.: Spacewatch || 
|- id="2003 JM20" bgcolor=#d6d6d6
| 0 ||  || MBA-O || 17.23 || 2.0 km || multiple || 2003–2021 || 26 Nov 2021 || 50 || align=left | Disc.: LPL/Spacewatch II || 
|- id="2003 JO20" bgcolor=#E9E9E9
| 0 ||  || MBA-M || 18.0 || data-sort-value="0.75" | 750 m || multiple || 2003–2020 || 15 Oct 2020 || 81 || align=left | Disc.: LPL/Spacewatch II || 
|- id="2003 JP20" bgcolor=#E9E9E9
| 1 ||  || MBA-M || 18.2 || data-sort-value="0.68" | 680 m || multiple || 2003–2020 || 15 Oct 2020 || 49 || align=left | Disc.: LPL/Spacewatch II || 
|- id="2003 JQ20" bgcolor=#E9E9E9
| 0 ||  || MBA-M || 18.22 || data-sort-value="0.95" | 950 m || multiple || 2003–2021 || 01 Nov 2021 || 29 || align=left | Disc.: LPL/Spacewatch II || 
|- id="2003 JR20" bgcolor=#fefefe
| 0 ||  || MBA-I || 18.0 || data-sort-value="0.75" | 750 m || multiple || 2003–2019 || 31 Oct 2019 || 75 || align=left | Disc.: Spacewatch || 
|- id="2003 JS20" bgcolor=#d6d6d6
| 0 ||  || MBA-O || 16.50 || 2.8 km || multiple || 2013–2021 || 09 Sep 2021 || 143 || align=left | Disc.: Spacewatch || 
|- id="2003 JT20" bgcolor=#fefefe
| 0 ||  || HUN || 18.99 || data-sort-value="0.47" | 470 m || multiple || 2003–2021 || 08 Sep 2021 || 69 || align=left | Disc.: SDSS || 
|- id="2003 JU20" bgcolor=#d6d6d6
| 0 ||  || MBA-O || 16.3 || 3.1 km || multiple || 2003–2019 || 04 Jan 2019 || 37 || align=left | Disc.: SpacewatchAlt.: 2010 JP182 || 
|- id="2003 JV20" bgcolor=#fefefe
| 1 ||  || MBA-I || 18.1 || data-sort-value="0.71" | 710 m || multiple || 2003–2019 || 25 Nov 2019 || 40 || align=left | Disc.: LPL/Spacewatch IIAlt.: 2015 OM47 || 
|- id="2003 JW20" bgcolor=#fefefe
| 0 ||  || MBA-I || 18.0 || data-sort-value="0.75" | 750 m || multiple || 2003–2021 || 07 Jun 2021 || 136 || align=left | Disc.: SpacewatchAdded on 22 July 2020Alt.: 2010 LG51 || 
|- id="2003 JX20" bgcolor=#fefefe
| 0 ||  || MBA-I || 18.4 || data-sort-value="0.62" | 620 m || multiple || 2003–2020 || 26 May 2020 || 77 || align=left | Disc.: SpacewatchAdded on 22 July 2020 || 
|- id="2003 JY20" bgcolor=#E9E9E9
| 0 ||  || MBA-M || 18.1 || 1.0 km || multiple || 2003–2020 || 26 Apr 2020 || 48 || align=left | Disc.: SpacewatchAdded on 22 July 2020 || 
|- id="2003 JA21" bgcolor=#E9E9E9
| 0 ||  || MBA-M || 18.2 || data-sort-value="0.96" | 960 m || multiple || 2003–2020 || 24 Jun 2020 || 62 || align=left | Disc.: SpacewatchAdded on 22 July 2020 || 
|- id="2003 JC21" bgcolor=#fefefe
| 1 ||  || MBA-I || 17.2 || 1.1 km || multiple || 2003–2021 || 16 Jan 2021 || 75 || align=left | Disc.: LPL/Spacewatch IIAdded on 17 January 2021 || 
|- id="2003 JD21" bgcolor=#fefefe
| 0 ||  || MBA-I || 18.6 || data-sort-value="0.57" | 570 m || multiple || 2000–2021 || 14 May 2021 || 66 || align=left | Disc.: SpacewatchAdded on 11 May 2021Alt.: 2017 DS18 || 
|- id="2003 JE21" bgcolor=#fefefe
| 0 ||  || MBA-I || 19.00 || data-sort-value="0.47" | 470 m || multiple || 2003–2021 || 01 May 2021 || 44 || align=left | Disc.: SpacewatchAdded on 11 May 2021 || 
|- id="2003 JG21" bgcolor=#fefefe
| 0 ||  || MBA-I || 18.7 || data-sort-value="0.54" | 540 m || multiple || 2003–2021 || 12 Jun 2021 || 93 || align=left | Disc.: LPL/Spacewatch IIAdded on 17 June 2021 || 
|- id="2003 JH21" bgcolor=#fefefe
| 1 ||  || MBA-I || 18.4 || data-sort-value="0.62" | 620 m || multiple || 2003–2018 || 11 Apr 2018 || 24 || align=left | Disc.: SpacewatchAdded on 21 August 2021 || 
|}
back to top

K 

|- id="2003 KM" bgcolor=#d6d6d6
| 0 || 2003 KM || MBA-O || 16.60 || 2.7 km || multiple || 2000–2021 || 06 Aug 2021 || 139 || align=left | Disc.: Table Mountain Obs.Alt.: 2019 AE24 || 
|- id="2003 KO" bgcolor=#E9E9E9
| 0 || 2003 KO || MBA-M || 16.70 || 1.9 km || multiple || 2003–2022 || 21 Jan 2022 || 223 || align=left | Disc.: Table Mountain Obs.Alt.: 2011 HZ23 || 
|- id="2003 KB1" bgcolor=#E9E9E9
| 1 ||  || MBA-M || 17.8 || 1.5 km || multiple || 2003–2021 || 12 Jun 2021 || 74 || align=left | Disc.: LPL/Spacewatch II || 
|- id="2003 KK1" bgcolor=#d6d6d6
| 0 ||  || MBA-O || 16.9 || 2.3 km || multiple || 2003–2021 || 18 Jan 2021 || 53 || align=left | Disc.: SpacewatchAdded on 22 July 2020 || 
|- id="2003 KT2" bgcolor=#E9E9E9
| – ||  || MBA-M || 18.9 || data-sort-value="0.92" | 920 m || single || 3 days || 25 May 2003 || 16 || align=left | Disc.: VATT || 
|- id="2003 KB3" bgcolor=#E9E9E9
| 0 ||  || MBA-M || 17.68 || 1.6 km || multiple || 2003–2021 || 16 Apr 2021 || 40 || align=left | Disc.: SpacewatchAdded on 19 October 2020 || 
|- id="2003 KG3" bgcolor=#d6d6d6
| 0 ||  || MBA-O || 16.46 || 2.8 km || multiple || 2003–2021 || 30 Nov 2021 || 190 || align=left | Disc.: LPL/Spacewatch IIAlt.: 2010 NB61, 2016 WT29 || 
|- id="2003 KH3" bgcolor=#fefefe
| – ||  || MBA-I || 19.6 || data-sort-value="0.36" | 360 m || single || 3 days || 26 May 2003 || 9 || align=left | Disc.: LPL/Spacewatch II || 
|- id="2003 KJ3" bgcolor=#fefefe
| 0 ||  || HUN || 18.59 || data-sort-value="0.57" | 570 m || multiple || 2003–2021 || 31 Aug 2021 || 71 || align=left | Disc.: Spacewatch || 
|- id="2003 KF4" bgcolor=#FFC2E0
| 5 ||  || APO || 23.3 || data-sort-value="0.078" | 78 m || single || 15 days || 08 Jun 2003 || 107 || align=left | Disc.: Desert Eagle Obs.AMO at MPC || 
|- id="2003 KV4" bgcolor=#fefefe
| 0 ||  || MBA-I || 17.8 || data-sort-value="0.82" | 820 m || multiple || 2003–2020 || 12 Dec 2020 || 141 || align=left | Disc.: Spacewatch || 
|- id="2003 KP5" bgcolor=#E9E9E9
| 0 ||  || MBA-M || 17.87 || 1.1 km || multiple || 1991–2021 || 02 Dec 2021 || 85 || align=left | Disc.: SpacewatchAlt.: 2020 JR6 || 
|- id="2003 KT5" bgcolor=#E9E9E9
| 3 ||  || MBA-M || 18.8 || data-sort-value="0.73" | 730 m || multiple || 2003–2020 || 27 Apr 2020 || 26 || align=left | Disc.: SpacewatchAdded on 22 July 2020 || 
|- id="2003 KW5" bgcolor=#E9E9E9
| 1 ||  || MBA-M || 19.09 || data-sort-value="0.45" | 450 m || multiple || 2003–2020 || 20 Oct 2020 || 45 || align=left | Disc.: SpacewatchAdded on 19 October 2020 || 
|- id="2003 KY5" bgcolor=#fefefe
| 1 ||  || MBA-I || 18.4 || data-sort-value="0.62" | 620 m || multiple || 2003–2019 || 03 Oct 2019 || 42 || align=left | Disc.: SpacewatchAlt.: 2018 FB10 || 
|- id="2003 KN6" bgcolor=#fefefe
| 0 ||  || MBA-I || 18.3 || data-sort-value="0.65" | 650 m || multiple || 2003–2019 || 27 Sep 2019 || 38 || align=left | Disc.: SpacewatchAlt.: 2014 FD57 || 
|- id="2003 KP6" bgcolor=#fefefe
| 0 ||  || MBA-I || 18.11 || data-sort-value="0.71" | 710 m || multiple || 1999–2021 || 13 Apr 2021 || 101 || align=left | Disc.: LPL/Spacewatch II || 
|- id="2003 KU6" bgcolor=#fefefe
| 0 ||  || MBA-I || 18.3 || data-sort-value="0.65" | 650 m || multiple || 2003–2021 || 11 Jun 2021 || 69 || align=left | Disc.: Spacewatch || 
|- id="2003 KB7" bgcolor=#E9E9E9
| 0 ||  || MBA-M || 17.1 || 2.1 km || multiple || 2003–2021 || 14 Apr 2021 || 45 || align=left | Disc.: SpacewatchAdded on 11 May 2021Alt.: 2012 GL26 || 
|- id="2003 KY7" bgcolor=#E9E9E9
| 2 ||  || MBA-M || 18.89 || data-sort-value="0.70" | 700 m || multiple || 2003–2021 || 11 Oct 2021 || 30 || align=left | Disc.: SpacewatchAdded on 5 November 2021Alt.: 2021 QF45 || 
|- id="2003 KZ7" bgcolor=#E9E9E9
| 0 ||  || MBA-M || 16.61 || 2.7 km || multiple || 1998–2021 || 11 May 2021 || 106 || align=left | Disc.: SpacewatchAlt.: 2012 HB82 || 
|- id="2003 KC8" bgcolor=#E9E9E9
| 0 ||  || MBA-M || 17.2 || 1.1 km || multiple || 2003–2018 || 15 Jan 2018 || 48 || align=left | Disc.: Spacewatch || 
|- id="2003 KJ8" bgcolor=#E9E9E9
| 0 ||  || MBA-M || 18.20 || data-sort-value="0.96" | 960 m || multiple || 2003–2021 || 31 Oct 2021 || 52 || align=left | Disc.: Spacewatch || 
|- id="2003 KM10" bgcolor=#fefefe
| 0 ||  || MBA-I || 19.04 || data-sort-value="0.46" | 460 m || multiple || 2003–2022 || 09 Jan 2022 || 44 || align=left | Disc.: Spacewatch || 
|- id="2003 KO10" bgcolor=#d6d6d6
| 0 ||  || MBA-O || 16.87 || 2.4 km || multiple || 2003–2021 || 02 Oct 2021 || 88 || align=left | Disc.: LPL/Spacewatch IIAlt.: 2006 WD127 || 
|- id="2003 KV10" bgcolor=#fefefe
| 0 ||  || MBA-I || 18.0 || data-sort-value="0.75" | 750 m || multiple || 2003–2020 || 10 Dec 2020 || 47 || align=left | Disc.: Spacewatch || 
|- id="2003 KP11" bgcolor=#d6d6d6
| 0 ||  || MBA-O || 16.71 || 2.5 km || multiple || 2003–2021 || 03 Oct 2021 || 76 || align=left | Disc.: LPL/Spacewatch II || 
|- id="2003 KT11" bgcolor=#E9E9E9
| 0 ||  || MBA-M || 17.8 || 1.5 km || multiple || 2003–2021 || 07 Jun 2021 || 82 || align=left | Disc.: LPL/Spacewatch II || 
|- id="2003 KW11" bgcolor=#d6d6d6
| 0 ||  || MBA-O || 15.7 || 4.0 km || multiple || 2002–2021 || 23 Oct 2021 || 156 || align=left | Disc.: SpacewatchAlt.: 2010 MG45, 2014 EE37 || 
|- id="2003 KP14" bgcolor=#fefefe
| 0 ||  || MBA-I || 18.0 || data-sort-value="0.75" | 750 m || multiple || 2000–2020 || 08 Nov 2020 || 111 || align=left | Disc.: Spacewatch || 
|- id="2003 KS14" bgcolor=#d6d6d6
| 0 ||  || MBA-O || 16.84 || 2.4 km || multiple || 2003–2021 || 01 Nov 2021 || 98 || align=left | Disc.: Spacewatch || 
|- id="2003 KT14" bgcolor=#d6d6d6
| 0 ||  || MBA-O || 16.16 || 3.3 km || multiple || 2003–2021 || 30 Aug 2021 || 103 || align=left | Disc.: SpacewatchAdded on 22 July 2020Alt.: 2010 MQ43 || 
|- id="2003 KW16" bgcolor=#FFC2E0
| 1 ||  || AMO || 20.1 || data-sort-value="0.34" | 340 m || multiple || 2003–2020 || 15 Dec 2020 || 168 || align=left | Disc.: LINEAR || 
|- id="2003 KZ16" bgcolor=#d6d6d6
| 0 ||  || MBA-O || 15.77 || 3.9 km || multiple || 2002–2021 || 08 Nov 2021 || 147 || align=left | Disc.: LINEARAdded on 21 August 2021Alt.: 2013 BA71 || 
|- id="2003 KQ18" bgcolor=#FFC2E0
| 2 ||  || AMO || 20.9 || data-sort-value="0.23" | 230 m || multiple || 2003–2010 || 12 Jun 2010 || 108 || align=left | Disc.: LINEAR || 
|- id="2003 KT18" bgcolor=#E9E9E9
| 0 ||  || MBA-M || 16.72 || 1.9 km || multiple || 2002–2021 || 31 Oct 2021 || 172 || align=left | Disc.: Reedy Creek Obs. || 
|- id="2003 KK20" bgcolor=#E9E9E9
| 0 ||  || MBA-M || 17.33 || 1.9 km || multiple || 2003–2020 || 02 Feb 2020 || 49 || align=left | Disc.: SpacewatchAlt.: 2019 YJ12 || 
|- id="2003 KM20" bgcolor=#d6d6d6
| 0 ||  || MBA-O || 17.04 || 2.2 km || multiple || 2003–2022 || 07 Jan 2022 || 94 || align=left | Disc.: Mauna Kea Obs.Added on 22 July 2020Alt.: 2015 MZ63 || 
|- id="2003 KO20" bgcolor=#C2E0FF
| 3 ||  || TNO || 6.6 || 159 km || multiple || 2003–2016 || 29 May 2016 || 12 || align=left | Disc.: Cerro TololoLoUTNOs, cubewano (cold) || 
|- id="2003 KP20" bgcolor=#C2E0FF
| E ||  || TNO || 7.2 || 125 km || single || 39 days || 08 Jul 2003 || 5 || align=left | Disc.: Cerro TololoLoUTNOs, cubewano? || 
|- id="2003 KQ20" bgcolor=#C7FF8F
| E ||  || CEN || 13.1 || 13 km || single || 1 day || 31 May 2003 || 3 || align=left | Disc.: Cerro Tololo || 
|- id="2003 KS20" bgcolor=#d6d6d6
| 0 ||  || MBA-O || 16.70 || 2.5 km || multiple || 2003–2021 || 28 Nov 2021 || 80 || align=left | Disc.: Cerro TololoAlt.: 2010 MX30 || 
|- id="2003 KW21" bgcolor=#d6d6d6
| 0 ||  || MBA-O || 16.97 || 2.2 km || multiple || 2003–2020 || 16 Mar 2020 || 47 || align=left | Disc.: Cerro TololoAlt.: 2015 MO42 || 
|- id="2003 KT22" bgcolor=#fefefe
| 0 ||  || MBA-I || 18.49 || data-sort-value="0.60" | 600 m || multiple || 2003–2021 || 28 Jul 2021 || 67 || align=left | Disc.: Cerro TololoAdded on 17 June 2021 || 
|- id="2003 KZ22" bgcolor=#fefefe
| 0 ||  || MBA-I || 18.8 || data-sort-value="0.52" | 520 m || multiple || 2003–2020 || 21 Oct 2020 || 205 || align=left | Disc.: Cerro TololoAlt.: 2014 WE487 || 
|- id="2003 KB24" bgcolor=#fefefe
| 0 ||  || MBA-I || 18.9 || data-sort-value="0.49" | 490 m || multiple || 2003–2021 || 13 Apr 2021 || 38 || align=left | Disc.: Cerro TololoAdded on 17 June 2021Alt.: 2021 EL20 || 
|- id="2003 KG24" bgcolor=#fefefe
| 0 ||  || MBA-I || 18.9 || data-sort-value="0.49" | 490 m || multiple || 2003–2020 || 16 Dec 2020 || 26 || align=left | Disc.: Cerro TololoAdded on 9 March 2021Alt.: 2019 JC20 || 
|- id="2003 KM24" bgcolor=#E9E9E9
| 0 ||  || MBA-M || 17.69 || 1.6 km || multiple || 2003–2021 || 17 Apr 2021 || 49 || align=left | Disc.: Cerro TololoAdded on 11 May 2021 || 
|- id="2003 KB25" bgcolor=#d6d6d6
| 1 ||  || MBA-O || 17.39 || 1.9 km || multiple || 2003–2021 || 14 Jul 2021 || 43 || align=left | Disc.: Cerro TololoAdded on 21 August 2021Alt.: 2015 KM73 || 
|- id="2003 KM25" bgcolor=#d6d6d6
| 0 ||  || MBA-O || 17.3 || 1.9 km || multiple || 2003–2020 || 21 Nov 2020 || 68 || align=left | Disc.: Cerro TololoAdded on 22 July 2020Alt.: 2015 XT299 || 
|- id="2003 KS25" bgcolor=#d6d6d6
| 3 ||  || MBA-O || 17.5 || 1.8 km || multiple || 2003–2020 || 23 Oct 2020 || 13 || align=left | Disc.: Cerro TololoAdded on 30 September 2021 || 
|- id="2003 KV25" bgcolor=#d6d6d6
| 1 ||  || MBA-O || 17.80 || 1.5 km || multiple || 2003–2022 || 27 Jan 2022 || 47 || align=left | Disc.: Cerro TololoAdded on 17 January 2021Alt.: 2017 BM161 || 
|- id="2003 KY25" bgcolor=#fefefe
| 2 ||  || MBA-I || 19.2 || data-sort-value="0.43" | 430 m || multiple || 2003–2021 || 28 Sep 2021 || 24 || align=left | Disc.: Cerro TololoAdded on 24 December 2021 || 
|- id="2003 KG26" bgcolor=#E9E9E9
| 3 ||  || MBA-M || 18.1 || 1.3 km || multiple || 2003–2020 || 25 May 2020 || 30 || align=left | Disc.: Cerro TololoAdded on 17 January 2021Alt.: 2004 VU100 || 
|- id="2003 KN26" bgcolor=#fefefe
| 0 ||  || MBA-I || 18.4 || data-sort-value="0.62" | 620 m || multiple || 2003–2020 || 16 Mar 2020 || 49 || align=left | Disc.: Cerro TololoAlt.: 2011 UK232 || 
|- id="2003 KB27" bgcolor=#E9E9E9
| 0 ||  || MBA-M || 18.31 || data-sort-value="0.92" | 920 m || multiple || 2003–2021 || 30 Sep 2021 || 25 || align=left | Disc.: Cerro TololoAlt.: 2015 FZ196 || 
|- id="2003 KC27" bgcolor=#E9E9E9
| 2 ||  || MBA-M || 18.0 || data-sort-value="0.75" | 750 m || multiple || 2003–2021 || 10 Jan 2021 || 57 || align=left | Disc.: Cerro TololoAdded on 24 August 2020 || 
|- id="2003 KG27" bgcolor=#d6d6d6
| 0 ||  || MBA-O || 17.24 || 2.0 km || multiple || 2003–2021 || 26 Nov 2021 || 37 || align=left | Disc.: Cerro TololoAdded on 5 November 2021Alt.: 2019 KJ49 || 
|- id="2003 KO27" bgcolor=#fefefe
| 0 ||  || MBA-I || 18.42 || data-sort-value="0.62" | 620 m || multiple || 2003–2021 || 09 May 2021 || 80 || align=left | Disc.: Cerro TololoAlt.: 2014 LK, 2015 VN8 || 
|- id="2003 KP27" bgcolor=#E9E9E9
| 1 ||  || MBA-M || 18.55 || data-sort-value="0.82" | 820 m || multiple || 2003–2021 || 24 Oct 2021 || 71 || align=left | Disc.: Cerro Tololo || 
|- id="2003 KS27" bgcolor=#fefefe
| 0 ||  || MBA-I || 18.57 || data-sort-value="0.57" | 570 m || multiple || 2000–2021 || 07 Apr 2021 || 42 || align=left | Disc.: Cerro TololoAlt.: 2011 RA2, 2015 XV272 || 
|- id="2003 KK30" bgcolor=#fefefe
| 0 ||  || MBA-I || 17.7 || data-sort-value="0.86" | 860 m || multiple || 2003–2021 || 18 Jan 2021 || 77 || align=left | Disc.: Spacewatch || 
|- id="2003 KQ31" bgcolor=#fefefe
| 0 ||  || MBA-I || 18.3 || data-sort-value="0.65" | 650 m || multiple || 2003–2020 || 18 Aug 2020 || 66 || align=left | Disc.: SpacewatchAdded on 22 July 2020 || 
|- id="2003 KU31" bgcolor=#E9E9E9
| 0 ||  || MBA-M || 16.9 || 2.3 km || multiple || 2003–2020 || 21 Feb 2020 || 54 || align=left | Disc.: Spacewatch || 
|- id="2003 KV31" bgcolor=#E9E9E9
| 0 ||  || MBA-M || 17.1 || 2.1 km || multiple || 2002–2021 || 10 May 2021 || 54 || align=left | Disc.: SpacewatchAdded on 30 September 2021 || 
|- id="2003 KY32" bgcolor=#FA8072
| 2 ||  || MCA || 18.8 || data-sort-value="0.52" | 520 m || multiple || 2003–2019 || 25 Aug 2019 || 22 || align=left | Disc.: Spacewatch || 
|- id="2003 KD33" bgcolor=#E9E9E9
| 0 ||  || MBA-M || 17.31 || 1.9 km || multiple || 2003–2021 || 17 Apr 2021 || 60 || align=left | Disc.: Spacewatch || 
|- id="2003 KP34" bgcolor=#E9E9E9
| 0 ||  || MBA-M || 16.9 || 2.3 km || multiple || 2003–2021 || 11 Jun 2021 || 155 || align=left | Disc.: LPL/Spacewatch IIAlt.: 2010 BA148, 2011 BX52, 2011 CC63 || 
|- id="2003 KJ37" bgcolor=#fefefe
| 0 ||  || HUN || 18.7 || data-sort-value="0.54" | 540 m || multiple || 2003–2021 || 16 Jan 2021 || 85 || align=left | Disc.: SDSS || 
|- id="2003 KO37" bgcolor=#E9E9E9
| 0 ||  || MBA-M || 16.93 || 2.3 km || multiple || 2003–2021 || 10 Apr 2021 || 92 || align=left | Disc.: SDSS || 
|- id="2003 KP37" bgcolor=#d6d6d6
| 0 ||  || MBA-O || 16.8 || 2.4 km || multiple || 2002–2019 || 02 Apr 2019 || 66 || align=left | Disc.: Spacewatch || 
|- id="2003 KQ37" bgcolor=#E9E9E9
| 0 ||  || MBA-M || 17.0 || 1.2 km || multiple || 2003–2020 || 10 Dec 2020 || 130 || align=left | Disc.: SDSS || 
|- id="2003 KR37" bgcolor=#E9E9E9
| 0 ||  || MBA-M || 17.48 || 1.8 km || multiple || 2003–2021 || 14 Apr 2021 || 75 || align=left | Disc.: SDSS || 
|- id="2003 KS37" bgcolor=#fefefe
| 0 ||  || MBA-I || 17.8 || data-sort-value="0.82" | 820 m || multiple || 2003–2021 || 14 Jun 2021 || 101 || align=left | Disc.: Spacewatch || 
|- id="2003 KT37" bgcolor=#fefefe
| 0 ||  || MBA-I || 18.5 || data-sort-value="0.59" | 590 m || multiple || 2003–2019 || 29 Jun 2019 || 67 || align=left | Disc.: Spacewatch || 
|- id="2003 KV37" bgcolor=#fefefe
| 0 ||  || MBA-I || 18.7 || data-sort-value="0.54" | 540 m || multiple || 2003–2020 || 17 Sep 2020 || 72 || align=left | Disc.: Cerro Tololo || 
|- id="2003 KW37" bgcolor=#E9E9E9
| 0 ||  || MBA-M || 17.00 || 2.2 km || multiple || 2003–2021 || 08 Aug 2021 || 154 || align=left | Disc.: SDSS || 
|- id="2003 KY37" bgcolor=#E9E9E9
| 0 ||  || MBA-M || 18.19 || data-sort-value="0.68" | 680 m || multiple || 2003–2021 || 06 Nov 2021 || 88 || align=left | Disc.: Cerro Tololo || 
|- id="2003 KZ37" bgcolor=#d6d6d6
| 0 ||  || MBA-O || 16.3 || 3.1 km || multiple || 2003–2021 || 12 Jan 2021 || 94 || align=left | Disc.: LPL/Spacewatch II || 
|- id="2003 KA38" bgcolor=#fefefe
| 0 ||  || MBA-I || 18.3 || data-sort-value="0.65" | 650 m || multiple || 2003–2020 || 22 Aug 2020 || 98 || align=left | Disc.: Spacewatch || 
|- id="2003 KB38" bgcolor=#E9E9E9
| 0 ||  || MBA-M || 16.94 || 1.2 km || multiple || 2003–2021 || 05 Dec 2021 || 84 || align=left | Disc.: LONEOS || 
|- id="2003 KC38" bgcolor=#fefefe
| 0 ||  || MBA-I || 18.29 || data-sort-value="0.65" | 650 m || multiple || 1993–2022 || 27 Jan 2022 || 77 || align=left | Disc.: LPL/Spacewatch II || 
|- id="2003 KF38" bgcolor=#E9E9E9
| 0 ||  || MBA-M || 17.56 || 1.7 km || multiple || 2011–2021 || 01 Oct 2021 || 82 || align=left | Disc.: Spacewatch || 
|- id="2003 KH38" bgcolor=#fefefe
| 0 ||  || MBA-I || 18.62 || data-sort-value="0.56" | 560 m || multiple || 2003–2022 || 25 Jan 2022 || 83 || align=left | Disc.: Cerro Tololo || 
|- id="2003 KK38" bgcolor=#fefefe
| 0 ||  || MBA-I || 17.5 || data-sort-value="0.94" | 940 m || multiple || 2003–2019 || 02 Dec 2019 || 40 || align=left | Disc.: SDSS || 
|- id="2003 KN38" bgcolor=#fefefe
| 0 ||  || MBA-I || 17.80 || data-sort-value="0.82" | 820 m || multiple || 2000–2021 || 09 May 2021 || 117 || align=left | Disc.: LPL/Spacewatch II || 
|- id="2003 KP38" bgcolor=#fefefe
| 0 ||  || MBA-I || 19.1 || data-sort-value="0.45" | 450 m || multiple || 2003–2020 || 22 Jun 2020 || 35 || align=left | Disc.: Cerro Tololo || 
|- id="2003 KQ38" bgcolor=#E9E9E9
| 1 ||  || MBA-M || 17.7 || 1.6 km || multiple || 2003–2017 || 23 Sep 2017 || 35 || align=left | Disc.: Spacewatch || 
|- id="2003 KR38" bgcolor=#fefefe
| 0 ||  || MBA-I || 18.5 || data-sort-value="0.59" | 590 m || multiple || 1997–2020 || 17 Oct 2020 || 69 || align=left | Disc.: Tenagra II Obs. || 
|- id="2003 KS38" bgcolor=#fefefe
| 1 ||  || HUN || 18.7 || data-sort-value="0.54" | 540 m || multiple || 2003–2019 || 09 Jan 2019 || 27 || align=left | Disc.: LPL/Spacewatch II || 
|- id="2003 KT38" bgcolor=#fefefe
| 0 ||  || HUN || 19.1 || data-sort-value="0.45" | 450 m || multiple || 2003–2021 || 09 Jun 2021 || 80 || align=left | Disc.: Spacewatch || 
|- id="2003 KW38" bgcolor=#d6d6d6
| 0 ||  || MBA-O || 16.62 || 2.6 km || multiple || 2003–2021 || 10 Aug 2021 || 74 || align=left | Disc.: Cerro Tololo || 
|- id="2003 KY38" bgcolor=#E9E9E9
| 0 ||  || MBA-M || 16.8 || 1.3 km || multiple || 2003–2020 || 18 Jul 2020 || 99 || align=left | Disc.: SDSS || 
|- id="2003 KZ38" bgcolor=#fefefe
| 0 ||  || MBA-I || 18.0 || data-sort-value="0.75" | 750 m || multiple || 2003–2019 || 26 Nov 2019 || 55 || align=left | Disc.: LPL/Spacewatch II || 
|- id="2003 KA39" bgcolor=#d6d6d6
| 0 ||  || MBA-O || 17.0 || 2.2 km || multiple || 2003–2019 || 20 Dec 2019 || 57 || align=left | Disc.: Spacewatch || 
|- id="2003 KB39" bgcolor=#FA8072
| 2 ||  || MCA || 18.9 || data-sort-value="0.49" | 490 m || multiple || 2003–2019 || 02 Nov 2019 || 51 || align=left | Disc.: Spacewatch || 
|- id="2003 KE39" bgcolor=#fefefe
| 0 ||  || MBA-I || 18.0 || data-sort-value="0.75" | 750 m || multiple || 2003–2018 || 17 Jun 2018 || 43 || align=left | Disc.: Spacewatch || 
|- id="2003 KF39" bgcolor=#fefefe
| 0 ||  || MBA-I || 18.48 || data-sort-value="0.60" | 600 m || multiple || 2003–2021 || 15 May 2021 || 65 || align=left | Disc.: Spacewatch || 
|- id="2003 KG39" bgcolor=#fefefe
| 0 ||  || HUN || 18.74 || data-sort-value="0.53" | 530 m || multiple || 2003–2022 || 10 Jan 2022 || 78 || align=left | Disc.: SDSS || 
|- id="2003 KJ39" bgcolor=#fefefe
| 1 ||  || MBA-I || 18.0 || data-sort-value="0.75" | 750 m || multiple || 2003–2019 || 02 Nov 2019 || 34 || align=left | Disc.: Spacewatch || 
|- id="2003 KK39" bgcolor=#fefefe
| 1 ||  || MBA-I || 18.7 || data-sort-value="0.54" | 540 m || multiple || 2003–2017 || 24 Oct 2017 || 37 || align=left | Disc.: Spacewatch || 
|- id="2003 KL39" bgcolor=#d6d6d6
| 0 ||  || MBA-O || 17.2 || 2.0 km || multiple || 2003–2019 || 07 Apr 2019 || 33 || align=left | Disc.: Cerro Tololo || 
|- id="2003 KM39" bgcolor=#fefefe
| 0 ||  || HUN || 18.83 || data-sort-value="0.51" | 510 m || multiple || 2003–2021 || 31 Aug 2021 || 75 || align=left | Disc.: SDSS || 
|- id="2003 KN39" bgcolor=#fefefe
| 0 ||  || MBA-I || 17.97 || data-sort-value="0.76" | 760 m || multiple || 2003–2021 || 14 Apr 2021 || 73 || align=left | Disc.: Spacewatch || 
|- id="2003 KO39" bgcolor=#fefefe
| 0 ||  || HUN || 18.9 || data-sort-value="0.49" | 490 m || multiple || 2003–2019 || 06 Mar 2019 || 31 || align=left | Disc.: SDSS || 
|- id="2003 KP39" bgcolor=#fefefe
| 1 ||  || MBA-I || 18.5 || data-sort-value="0.59" | 590 m || multiple || 2003–2019 || 23 Oct 2019 || 26 || align=left | Disc.: Spacewatch || 
|- id="2003 KQ39" bgcolor=#fefefe
| 2 ||  || MBA-I || 18.4 || data-sort-value="0.62" | 620 m || multiple || 2003–2016 || 24 Dec 2016 || 35 || align=left | Disc.: Cerro Tololo || 
|- id="2003 KR39" bgcolor=#fefefe
| 0 ||  || MBA-I || 18.1 || data-sort-value="0.71" | 710 m || multiple || 2003–2019 || 03 Oct 2019 || 68 || align=left | Disc.: Spacewatch || 
|- id="2003 KT39" bgcolor=#d6d6d6
| 0 ||  || MBA-O || 17.1 || 2.1 km || multiple || 2003–2019 || 07 May 2019 || 37 || align=left | Disc.: Cerro Tololo || 
|- id="2003 KU39" bgcolor=#d6d6d6
| 0 ||  || MBA-O || 17.00 || 2.2 km || multiple || 2003–2021 || 01 Nov 2021 || 36 || align=left | Disc.: Spacewatch || 
|- id="2003 KV39" bgcolor=#fefefe
| 0 ||  || MBA-I || 19.32 || data-sort-value="0.41" | 410 m || multiple || 2003–2021 || 29 Oct 2021 || 60 || align=left | Disc.: Cerro Tololo || 
|- id="2003 KW39" bgcolor=#E9E9E9
| 2 ||  || MBA-M || 18.2 || data-sort-value="0.68" | 680 m || multiple || 2003–2019 || 08 Feb 2019 || 25 || align=left | Disc.: Cerro Tololo || 
|- id="2003 KX39" bgcolor=#fefefe
| 0 ||  || MBA-I || 18.8 || data-sort-value="0.52" | 520 m || multiple || 2003–2020 || 23 Oct 2020 || 44 || align=left | Disc.: Cerro Tololo || 
|- id="2003 KY39" bgcolor=#E9E9E9
| 0 ||  || MBA-M || 17.64 || 1.7 km || multiple || 2003–2021 || 09 Apr 2021 || 69 || align=left | Disc.: Cerro Tololo || 
|- id="2003 KZ39" bgcolor=#d6d6d6
| 0 ||  || MBA-O || 16.7 || 2.5 km || multiple || 2003–2021 || 06 Jan 2021 || 62 || align=left | Disc.: Spacewatch || 
|- id="2003 KA40" bgcolor=#d6d6d6
| 0 ||  || MBA-O || 17.0 || 2.2 km || multiple || 2003–2020 || 24 Dec 2020 || 45 || align=left | Disc.: Spacewatch || 
|- id="2003 KB40" bgcolor=#fefefe
| 1 ||  || MBA-I || 18.0 || data-sort-value="0.75" | 750 m || multiple || 2003–2019 || 29 Oct 2019 || 35 || align=left | Disc.: Spacewatch || 
|- id="2003 KC40" bgcolor=#E9E9E9
| 0 ||  || MBA-M || 17.72 || 1.6 km || multiple || 2003–2021 || 09 May 2021 || 50 || align=left | Disc.: SDSS || 
|- id="2003 KD40" bgcolor=#E9E9E9
| 0 ||  || MBA-M || 18.4 || data-sort-value="0.88" | 880 m || multiple || 2003–2020 || 22 Apr 2020 || 35 || align=left | Disc.: Cerro Tololo || 
|- id="2003 KE40" bgcolor=#E9E9E9
| 0 ||  || MBA-M || 17.7 || 1.6 km || multiple || 2003–2019 || 19 Dec 2019 || 63 || align=left | Disc.: Cerro Tololo || 
|- id="2003 KG40" bgcolor=#d6d6d6
| 0 ||  || MBA-O || 17.2 || 2.0 km || multiple || 2003–2020 || 19 Nov 2020 || 57 || align=left | Disc.: Cerro Tololo || 
|- id="2003 KH40" bgcolor=#E9E9E9
| 0 ||  || MBA-M || 16.8 || 2.4 km || multiple || 1994–2021 || 08 Jun 2021 || 39 || align=left | Disc.: Cerro Tololo || 
|- id="2003 KJ40" bgcolor=#E9E9E9
| 0 ||  || MBA-M || 17.98 || 1.1 km || multiple || 2003–2021 || 05 Oct 2021 || 66 || align=left | Disc.: SpacewatchAdded on 22 July 2020 || 
|- id="2003 KK40" bgcolor=#d6d6d6
| 0 ||  || MBA-O || 16.86 || 2.4 km || multiple || 2003–2021 || 08 Nov 2021 || 55 || align=left | Disc.: LPL/Spacewatch IIAdded on 22 July 2020 || 
|- id="2003 KL40" bgcolor=#d6d6d6
| 0 ||  || MBA-O || 17.27 || 2.0 km || multiple || 2003–2021 || 05 Jul 2021 || 36 || align=left | Disc.: SpacewatchAdded on 13 September 2020 || 
|- id="2003 KM40" bgcolor=#E9E9E9
| 0 ||  || MBA-M || 17.8 || data-sort-value="0.82" | 820 m || multiple || 2003–2020 || 19 Jul 2020 || 48 || align=left | Disc.: SpacewatchAdded on 17 January 2021 || 
|- id="2003 KN40" bgcolor=#E9E9E9
| 0 ||  || MBA-M || 16.7 || 2.5 km || multiple || 2003–2021 || 19 May 2021 || 49 || align=left | Disc.: SpacewatchAdded on 17 June 2021 || 
|- id="2003 KQ40" bgcolor=#E9E9E9
| 0 ||  || MBA-M || 18.38 || data-sort-value="0.89" | 890 m || multiple || 2003–2021 || 02 Dec 2021 || 29 || align=left | Disc.: SpacewatchAdded on 30 September 2021 || 
|- id="2003 KS40" bgcolor=#E9E9E9
| 1 ||  || MBA-M || 17.9 || 1.1 km || multiple || 2003–2021 || 03 Oct 2021 || 25 || align=left | Disc.: SpacewatchAdded on 5 November 2021 || 
|}
back to top

L 

|- id="2003 LH" bgcolor=#FFC2E0
| 6 || 2003 LH || ATE || 25.2 || data-sort-value="0.032" | 32 m || single || 59 days || 31 Jul 2003 || 50 || align=left | Disc.: LINEAR || 
|- id="2003 LS1" bgcolor=#fefefe
| 1 ||  || HUN || 18.9 || data-sort-value="0.49" | 490 m || multiple || 2003–2020 || 23 Oct 2020 || 60 || align=left | Disc.: Spacewatch || 
|- id="2003 LW1" bgcolor=#FFC2E0
| 6 ||  || AMO || 23.2 || data-sort-value="0.081" | 81 m || single || 12 days || 15 Jun 2003 || 76 || align=left | Disc.: LINEAR || 
|- id="2003 LM2" bgcolor=#fefefe
| 0 ||  || MBA-I || 17.9 || data-sort-value="0.78" | 780 m || multiple || 2003–2020 || 09 Dec 2020 || 82 || align=left | Disc.: LPL/Spacewatch II || 
|- id="2003 LW2" bgcolor=#FFC2E0
| 0 ||  || APO || 25.8 || data-sort-value="0.025" | 25 m || multiple || 2003–2021 || 01 Jun 2021 || 70 || align=left | Disc.: LINEAR || 
|- id="2003 LN3" bgcolor=#E9E9E9
| 0 ||  || MBA-M || 17.5 || data-sort-value="0.94" | 940 m || multiple || 2003–2020 || 07 Oct 2020 || 121 || align=left | Disc.: SpacewatchAlt.: 2008 UX320, 2011 GZ19, 2016 QA79 || 
|- id="2003 LR3" bgcolor=#FA8072
| – ||  || MCA || 22.5 || data-sort-value="0.094" | 94 m || single || 2 days || 06 Jun 2003 || 14 || align=left | Disc.: Spacewatch || 
|- id="2003 LA5" bgcolor=#d6d6d6
| 0 ||  || MBA-O || 17.6 || 1.7 km || multiple || 2003–2020 || 28 Jun 2020 || 50 || align=left | Disc.: Tenagra II Obs. || 
|- id="2003 LE5" bgcolor=#fefefe
| 0 ||  || MBA-I || 19.01 || data-sort-value="0.47" | 470 m || multiple || 2003–2021 || 31 Oct 2021 || 31 || align=left | Disc.: Spacewatch || 
|- id="2003 LZ5" bgcolor=#fefefe
| 1 ||  || HUN || 18.8 || data-sort-value="0.52" | 520 m || multiple || 2003–2020 || 11 Dec 2020 || 53 || align=left | Disc.: Spacewatch || 
|- id="2003 LC6" bgcolor=#fefefe
| 0 ||  || MBA-I || 17.67 || data-sort-value="0.87" | 870 m || multiple || 2003–2021 || 10 May 2021 || 119 || align=left | Disc.: Spacewatch || 
|- id="2003 LE6" bgcolor=#fefefe
| 0 ||  || MBA-I || 18.7 || data-sort-value="0.54" | 540 m || multiple || 2003–2021 || 11 Jun 2021 || 45 || align=left | Disc.: Table Mountain Obs.Alt.: 2010 NT144 || 
|- id="2003 LK6" bgcolor=#d6d6d6
| 0 ||  || MBA-O || 16.30 || 3.1 km || multiple || 2003–2021 || 01 Dec 2021 || 51 || align=left | Disc.: Siding Spring Obs.Added on 13 September 2020 || 
|- id="2003 LN6" bgcolor=#FFC2E0
| 3 ||  || ATE || 24.6 || data-sort-value="0.043" | 43 m || multiple || 2003–2015 || 24 Feb 2015 || 97 || align=left | Disc.: LINEAR || 
|- id="2003 LZ6" bgcolor=#C2E0FF
| E ||  || TNO || 6.5 || 172 km || single || 1 day || 02 Jun 2003 || 3 || align=left | Disc.: Cerro TololoLoUTNOs, cubewano? || 
|- id="2003 LA7" bgcolor=#C2E0FF
| 2 ||  || TNO || 6.5 || 181 km || multiple || 2003–2008 || 12 Mar 2008 || 18 || align=left | Disc.: Cerro TololoLoUTNOs, res1:4 || 
|- id="2003 LC7" bgcolor=#C2E0FF
| E ||  || TNO || 6.2 || 197 km || single || 37 days || 08 Jul 2003 || 5 || align=left | Disc.: Cerro TololoLoUTNOs, cubewano? || 
|- id="2003 LD7" bgcolor=#C2E0FF
| E ||  || TNO || 6.9 || 143 km || single || 36 days || 07 Jul 2003 || 5 || align=left | Disc.: Cerro TololoLoUTNOs, cubewano? || 
|- id="2003 LE7" bgcolor=#C2E0FF
| E ||  || TNO || 7.6 || 143 km || single || 1 day || 02 Jun 2003 || 3 || align=left | Disc.: Cerro TololoLoUTNOs, plutino? || 
|- id="2003 LF7" bgcolor=#C2E0FF
| E ||  || TNO || 7.9 || 124 km || single || 37 days || 08 Jul 2003 || 6 || align=left | Disc.: Cerro TololoLoUTNOs, plutino? || 
|- id="2003 LH7" bgcolor=#C7FF8F
| E ||  || CEN || 12.5 || 18 km || single || 1 day || 02 Jun 2003 || 3 || align=left | Disc.: Cerro Tololo || 
|- id="2003 LY7" bgcolor=#E9E9E9
| 1 ||  || MBA-M || 18.3 || 1.2 km || multiple || 2003–2021 || 08 Jun 2021 || 31 || align=left | Disc.: Cerro Tololo || 
|- id="2003 LC9" bgcolor=#fefefe
| 0 ||  || MBA-I || 19.1 || data-sort-value="0.45" | 450 m || multiple || 2003–2018 || 18 Aug 2018 || 23 || align=left | Disc.: Cerro Tololo || 
|- id="2003 LD9" bgcolor=#C2E0FF
| 3 ||  || TNO || 6.8 || 182 km || multiple || 2003–2019 || 06 Jun 2019 || 15 || align=left | Disc.: Cerro TololoLoUTNOs, other TNO || 
|- id="2003 LX9" bgcolor=#d6d6d6
| 0 ||  || MBA-O || 16.4 || 2.9 km || multiple || 2003–2019 || 29 May 2019 || 49 || align=left | Disc.: Cerro Tololo || 
|- id="2003 LA10" bgcolor=#fefefe
| 0 ||  || MBA-I || 17.4 || data-sort-value="0.98" | 980 m || multiple || 2003–2020 || 21 Jan 2020 || 90 || align=left | Disc.: Spacewatch || 
|- id="2003 LC10" bgcolor=#fefefe
| 0 ||  || MBA-I || 18.4 || data-sort-value="0.62" | 620 m || multiple || 2003–2018 || 14 Aug 2018 || 40 || align=left | Disc.: Spacewatch || 
|- id="2003 LD10" bgcolor=#fefefe
| 0 ||  || MBA-I || 18.3 || data-sort-value="0.65" | 650 m || multiple || 2003–2018 || 11 Jul 2018 || 41 || align=left | Disc.: Spacewatch || 
|- id="2003 LF10" bgcolor=#E9E9E9
| 0 ||  || MBA-M || 18.3 || data-sort-value="0.92" | 920 m || multiple || 2003–2020 || 24 Jun 2020 || 34 || align=left | Disc.: Cerro Tololo || 
|- id="2003 LG10" bgcolor=#fefefe
| 0 ||  || HUN || 18.82 || data-sort-value="0.51" | 510 m || multiple || 2009–2021 || 07 Jun 2021 || 44 || align=left | Disc.: Spacewatch || 
|- id="2003 LJ10" bgcolor=#fefefe
| 0 ||  || MBA-I || 17.5 || data-sort-value="0.94" | 940 m || multiple || 2003–2021 || 16 Jan 2021 || 64 || align=left | Disc.: Cerro Tololo || 
|- id="2003 LK10" bgcolor=#fefefe
| 0 ||  || MBA-I || 17.8 || data-sort-value="0.82" | 820 m || multiple || 2003–2019 || 24 Dec 2019 || 68 || align=left | Disc.: Spacewatch || 
|- id="2003 LL10" bgcolor=#fefefe
| 0 ||  || MBA-I || 17.9 || data-sort-value="0.78" | 780 m || multiple || 2003–2019 || 08 Nov 2019 || 63 || align=left | Disc.: Spacewatch || 
|- id="2003 LM10" bgcolor=#fefefe
| 1 ||  || MBA-I || 19.0 || data-sort-value="0.47" | 470 m || multiple || 2003–2021 || 21 Mar 2021 || 69 || align=left | Disc.: Cerro Tololo || 
|- id="2003 LP10" bgcolor=#E9E9E9
| 0 ||  || MBA-M || 16.91 || 1.2 km || multiple || 2003–2021 || 06 Dec 2021 || 88 || align=left | Disc.: Spacewatch || 
|- id="2003 LQ10" bgcolor=#E9E9E9
| 0 ||  || MBA-M || 16.9 || 1.8 km || multiple || 2003–2020 || 17 May 2020 || 73 || align=left | Disc.: Spacewatch || 
|- id="2003 LR10" bgcolor=#d6d6d6
| 0 ||  || MBA-O || 16.8 || 2.4 km || multiple || 2003–2021 || 11 Jan 2021 || 56 || align=left | Disc.: Cerro Tololo || 
|- id="2003 LS10" bgcolor=#fefefe
| 0 ||  || MBA-I || 18.3 || data-sort-value="0.65" | 650 m || multiple || 2003–2018 || 12 Jul 2018 || 46 || align=left | Disc.: Spacewatch || 
|- id="2003 LT10" bgcolor=#E9E9E9
| 2 ||  || MBA-M || 18.4 || data-sort-value="0.62" | 620 m || multiple || 2003–2020 || 12 Sep 2020 || 56 || align=left | Disc.: Spacewatch || 
|- id="2003 LU10" bgcolor=#E9E9E9
| 2 ||  || MBA-M || 18.1 || data-sort-value="0.71" | 710 m || multiple || 2003–2019 || 03 Jul 2019 || 43 || align=left | Disc.: Cerro Tololo || 
|- id="2003 LV10" bgcolor=#E9E9E9
| 0 ||  || MBA-M || 17.50 || 1.3 km || multiple || 2007–2021 || 09 Aug 2021 || 83 || align=left | Disc.: Spacewatch || 
|- id="2003 LW10" bgcolor=#d6d6d6
| 0 ||  || MBA-O || 17.7 || 1.6 km || multiple || 2003–2021 || 04 Jan 2021 || 50 || align=left | Disc.: Cerro Tololo || 
|- id="2003 LY10" bgcolor=#E9E9E9
| 0 ||  || MBA-M || 17.6 || 1.7 km || multiple || 2003–2019 || 07 Jan 2019 || 50 || align=left | Disc.: Cerro Tololo || 
|- id="2003 LZ10" bgcolor=#d6d6d6
| 0 ||  || MBA-O || 17.3 || 1.9 km || multiple || 2003–2020 || 14 Sep 2020 || 40 || align=left | Disc.: Cerro Tololo || 
|- id="2003 LA11" bgcolor=#E9E9E9
| 0 ||  || MBA-M || 17.55 || 1.7 km || multiple || 2003–2021 || 10 May 2021 || 44 || align=left | Disc.: Cerro Tololo || 
|- id="2003 LD11" bgcolor=#d6d6d6
| 0 ||  || MBA-O || 17.06 || 2.2 km || multiple || 2003–2021 || 30 Oct 2021 || 78 || align=left | Disc.: Spacewatch || 
|- id="2003 LG11" bgcolor=#fefefe
| 0 ||  || MBA-I || 18.34 || data-sort-value="0.64" | 640 m || multiple || 2003–2021 || 18 May 2021 || 88 || align=left | Disc.: Tenagra II Obs. || 
|- id="2003 LH11" bgcolor=#fefefe
| 0 ||  || MBA-I || 19.3 || data-sort-value="0.41" | 410 m || multiple || 2003–2020 || 17 Sep 2020 || 67 || align=left | Disc.: Cerro Tololo || 
|- id="2003 LJ11" bgcolor=#fefefe
| 1 ||  || MBA-I || 18.3 || data-sort-value="0.65" | 650 m || multiple || 2003–2019 || 06 Sep 2019 || 33 || align=left | Disc.: Cerro Tololo || 
|- id="2003 LK11" bgcolor=#fefefe
| 2 ||  || MBA-I || 18.1 || data-sort-value="0.71" | 710 m || multiple || 2003–2019 || 29 Sep 2019 || 35 || align=left | Disc.: LPL/Spacewatch II || 
|- id="2003 LL11" bgcolor=#fefefe
| 0 ||  || MBA-I || 18.23 || data-sort-value="0.67" | 670 m || multiple || 2003–2021 || 12 May 2021 || 40 || align=left | Disc.: Spacewatch || 
|- id="2003 LM11" bgcolor=#E9E9E9
| 0 ||  || MBA-M || 17.3 || 1.5 km || multiple || 2003–2020 || 16 Jun 2020 || 37 || align=left | Disc.: LPL/Spacewatch II || 
|- id="2003 LN11" bgcolor=#d6d6d6
| 0 ||  || MBA-O || 17.4 || 1.8 km || multiple || 2003–2021 || 18 Jan 2021 || 60 || align=left | Disc.: Cerro Tololo || 
|- id="2003 LO11" bgcolor=#d6d6d6
| 0 ||  || MBA-O || 17.1 || 2.1 km || multiple || 2003–2018 || 15 Jan 2018 || 62 || align=left | Disc.: Cerro Tololo || 
|- id="2003 LP11" bgcolor=#fefefe
| 1 ||  || HUN || 18.5 || data-sort-value="0.59" | 590 m || multiple || 2003–2020 || 20 May 2020 || 47 || align=left | Disc.: Spacewatch || 
|- id="2003 LQ11" bgcolor=#fefefe
| 1 ||  || MBA-I || 18.26 || data-sort-value="0.66" | 660 m || multiple || 2011–2021 || 08 Apr 2021 || 58 || align=left | Disc.: Spacewatch || 
|- id="2003 LR11" bgcolor=#E9E9E9
| 0 ||  || MBA-M || 17.8 || 1.5 km || multiple || 2003–2021 || 10 Jun 2021 || 42 || align=left | Disc.: Spacewatch || 
|- id="2003 LS11" bgcolor=#E9E9E9
| 0 ||  || MBA-M || 17.3 || 1.9 km || multiple || 2003–2019 || 20 Dec 2019 || 79 || align=left | Disc.: Cerro Tololo || 
|- id="2003 LU11" bgcolor=#fefefe
| 0 ||  || MBA-I || 18.0 || data-sort-value="0.75" | 750 m || multiple || 2003–2019 || 27 Oct 2019 || 39 || align=left | Disc.: Spacewatch || 
|- id="2003 LV11" bgcolor=#fefefe
| 0 ||  || MBA-I || 18.5 || data-sort-value="0.59" | 590 m || multiple || 2003–2019 || 29 Sep 2019 || 32 || align=left | Disc.: Spacewatch || 
|- id="2003 LX11" bgcolor=#d6d6d6
| 0 ||  || MBA-O || 17.4 || 1.8 km || multiple || 2003–2016 || 27 Oct 2016 || 38 || align=left | Disc.: Cerro Tololo || 
|- id="2003 LY11" bgcolor=#E9E9E9
| 0 ||  || MBA-M || 17.5 || 1.3 km || multiple || 2003–2016 || 25 Sep 2016 || 46 || align=left | Disc.: SpacewatchAdded on 19 October 2020 || 
|- id="2003 LZ11" bgcolor=#E9E9E9
| 2 ||  || MBA-M || 18.3 || data-sort-value="0.65" | 650 m || multiple || 2003–2020 || 10 Sep 2020 || 35 || align=left | Disc.: SDSSAdded on 19 October 2020 || 
|- id="2003 LA12" bgcolor=#E9E9E9
| 1 ||  || MBA-M || 17.7 || data-sort-value="0.86" | 860 m || multiple || 2003–2021 || 17 Jan 2021 || 65 || align=left | Disc.: Cerro TololoAdded on 17 January 2021 || 
|}
back to top

References 
 

Lists of unnumbered minor planets